= Nivalenol =

Type of mycotoxin

Nivalenol (NIV)

Names
- Other names (3α,4β,7α)-12,13-epoxy-3,4,7,15-tetrahydroxy-trichothec-9-en-8-one

Identifiers
CAS Number	23282-20-4
3D model (JSmol)	Interactive image
ChEBI	CHEBI:7599
ChemSpider	29515
ECHA InfoCard	100.150.573
KEGG	C06080
PubChem CID	31829
UNII	5WOP02RM1U
CompTox Dashboard (EPA)	DTXSID3021067
- InChI: InChI=1S/C15H20O7/c1-6-3-7-14(4-16,11(20)8(6)17)13(2)10(19)9(18)12(22-7)15(13)5-21-15/h3,7,9-12,16,18-20H,4-5H2,1-2H3/t7-,9-,10-,11-,12-,13-,14-,15+/m1/s1 Key: UKOTXHQERFPCBU-XBXCNEFVSA-N; InChI=1/C15H20O6/c1-7-3-9-14(5-16,11(19)10(7)18)13(2)4-8(17)12(21-9)15(13)6-20-15/h3,8-9,11-12,16-17,19H,4-6H2,1-2H3/t8-,9-,11-,12-,13-,14-,15+/m1/s1
- SMILES: CC1=C[C@H]2O[C@@H]3[C@H](O)[C@@H](O)[C@@](C)([C@]34CO4)[C@@]2(CO)[C@H](O)C1=O

Properties
Chemical formula	C_{15}H_{20}O_{7}
Molar mass	312.318 g·mol^{−1}
Appearance	solid
Density	1.6±0.1 g/cm^{3}
Melting point	222–223 °C (432–433 °F; 495–496 K)
Boiling point	585.1±50 °C
Solubility in water	3.54*10^5 mg/L at 25 °C
Solubility	soluble in polar organic solvents
Acidity (pK_{a})	11.78

Hazards
- GHS labelling
Pictograms	(GHS02: Flammable) (GHS06: Toxic) (GHS07: Exclamation mark)
Signal word	Danger
Hazard statements	H225, H300, H302, H310, H312, H319, H330, H332
Precautionary statements	P210, P241, P260, P262, P264, P270, P271, P280, P284, P301+P310, P302+P350, P304+P340, P310, P320, P321, P330, P361, P363, P403+P233, P405, P501
NFPA 704 (fire diamond)	1 3 0
Flash point	5 °C (41 °F; 278 K)
Autoignition temperature	525 °C (977 °F; 798 K)
Threshold limit value (TLV)	20 ppm (34 mg/m^{3}) Skin
- Lethal dose or concentration (LD, LC)
LD_{50} (median dose)	19.5 mg/kg (rats, oral), 38.9 mg/kg (mouse, oral)
- NIOSH (US health exposure limits)
PEL (Permissible)	40 ppm (70 mg/m^{3})
REL (Recommended)	20 ppm (34 mg/m^{3})
- Except where otherwise noted, data are given for materials in their standard state (at 25 °C [77 °F], 100 kPa). Infobox references

Nivalenol (NIV) is a mycotoxin of the trichothecene group. In nature it is mainly found in fungi of the Fusarium species. The Fusarium species belongs to the most prevalent mycotoxin producing fungi in the temperate regions of the northern hemisphere, therefore making them a considerable risk for the food crop production industry.

The fungi are abundant in various agricultural products (cereal crops) and their further processed products (malt, beer and bread). "The Fusarium species invade and grow on crops, and may produce nivalenol under moist and cool conditions".

In pigs, the symptoms observed after nivalenol exposure are "feed refusal, vomiting, gastroenteric and dermal irritation or necrosis and immunological dysfunction", as well as haematotoxicity, resulting in a low leukocyte count.

== History ==
In the period of 1946 to 1963, several cases of intoxication due to the ingestion of Fusarium infected grains (scrabby grain disease) were reported in Japan, Korea and India. There have been no reports of lethal cases and only mild symptoms like nausea, vomiting, diarrhea and abdominal pain. In these incidents F. graminaerum could be isolated, which hints at a nivalenol or deoxynivalenol contamination.

In the same period two outbreaks involving over 100 cases were reported in India and China. These outbreaks were also non-lethal.

A well documented and acute outbreak in India in 1987 affected around 50,000 thousand people. Several Fusarium toxins under which nivalenol (0.03–0.1 mg/kg in 2 of 24 samples), deoxynivalenol (0.34–8.4 mg/kg in 11 of 24 samples) and acetyldeoxynivalenol (0.6–2.4 mg/kg in 4 of 24 samples) were found in rain-damaged wheat used for bread production. There were again no lethal cases and reported symptoms were abdominal pain, diarrhea, bloody stool and vomiting. These cases show that the main emerging danger of nivalenol comes from Fusarium infected cereals and is mainly via the route of digestion of uncontrolled wheat or other grains that are further processed or does enter the food chain via another route.

=== Weaponization and other instances of nivalenol poisoning ===
Nivalenol as well as deoxynivalenol and T-2 toxin have been used as biological warfare agents in Laos and Cambodia as well as in Afghanistan. The Soviet Union has been alleged to have provided the mycotoxins and to have used them themselves in Afghanistan. All three compounds could be identified in the vegetation at affected sites, whereas T-2 toxin could also be found in urine and blood samples of victims.

The best documented use of trichothecenes in warfare is the yellow rain controversy, a number of attacks in Southeastern Asia, Laos and Afghanistan which used a "yellow rain" as described by witnesses. The toxins were delivered as a cloud of yellow dust or droplets. An article by L. R. Ember published in 1984 in Chemical Engineering News describes the use of trichothecene mycotoxins as biological weapons in Southeast Asia in a very detailed manner, covering reports of survivors, eyewitnesses, prisoners of war and Soviet informants along with information on the presence of Soviet technicians and laboratories. This led to the conclusion that these toxins have been used in Southeast Asia and Afghanistan. The Russian government however refuses to give a statement on these pieces of evidence. Furthermore, it has been shown that samples taken on the location of attacks contain these toxins, while sites that have not been attacked do not show any signs of toxins in them.

Even though it remains questionable if all witness reports are reliable sources of evidence, the symptoms recorded are typical for intoxication with trichothecenes.

There was a number of ways in which trichothecenes were weaponized, such as dispersion as aerosol, smoke, droplets or dust from aircraft, missiles, handheld devices or artillery.

=== Safety guidelines in the food industry ===
In 2000 a scientific opinion on nivalenol was issued by the Scientific Committee on Food (SCF). A temporary tolerable daily intake (t-TDI) of 0–0.7 μg/kg bw per day was issued after evaluation of the general toxicity as well as the haematoxicity and the immunotoxicity. This t-TDI was reaffirmed by the SCF in 2002.

In 2010, the Japanese Food Safety Commission (FSCJ) issued a t-TDI of 0.4 μg/kg bw per day.

Between 2001 and 2011, the European Food Safety Authority (EFSA) collected data from 15774 nivalenol occurrences in 18 European countries to be assessed. This led to the establishment of a TDI of 1.2 μg/kg bw per day. Nivalenol was in this studies not found to be genotoxic, but well haematotoxic and immunotoxic.

== Structure and reactivity ==
Nivalenol as part of the family of mycotoxins has the common structure which all members of this toxin family have. This includes the basic structure of a cyclohexene and a tetrahydropyran ring connected at C6 and C11. Additionally an ethyl-group connects the tetrahydropyran at C2 and C5 and a keto group is attached at the cyclohexene at C8. The epoxide group, responsible for the reactivity for most parts, is attached at C12 and C13 in the tetrahydropyran. Only the remaining groups at positions C3, C4, C7, C15 vary for the different mycotoxins. In case of nivalenol each of the four remaining groups is a substituted hydroxyl group which add up to the reactivity in presence of hydrophilic compounds or subgroups respectively thanks to their polar characteristics. In acidic medium the keto group is capable of reacting with a proton promoting polarity and reactivity as well. But altogether the epoxide group is crucial for the reactivity of the molecule.

== Available forms ==
Nivalenol, deoxynivalenol and T2-toxin are the three structural and similar synthesized mycotoxins naturally appearing in fungi (e.g. Fusarium).

== Synthesis ==
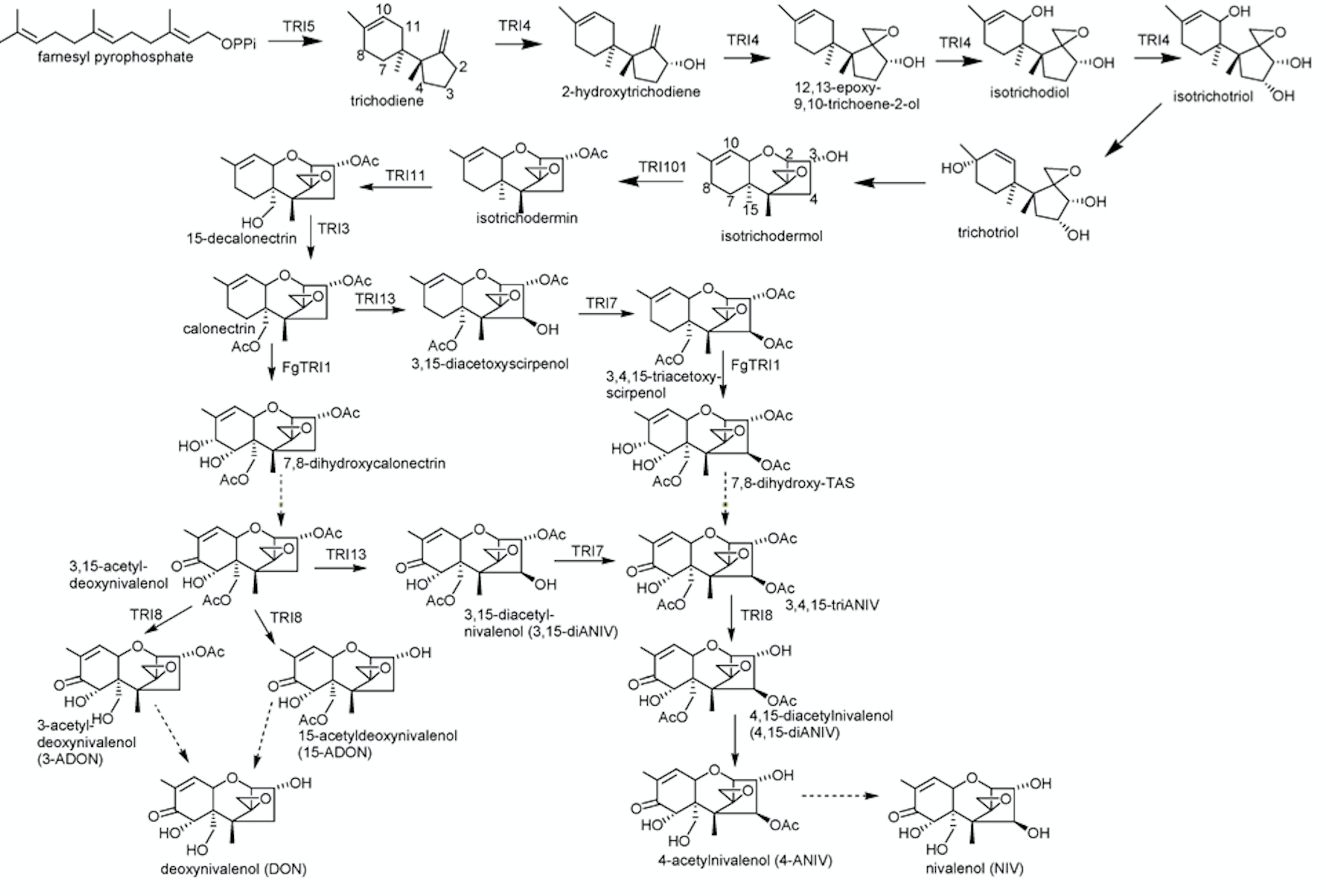
Synthesis pathways of nivalenol and deoxynivalenol

The synthesis of nivalenol is a 16 step process. It can differ in step 11 to step 14 depending on the order in which the reaction controlling trichodiene synthases TRI1, TRI13 and TRI7 are catalyzing. Farnesyl pyrophosphate is used as starting compound for the synthesis of nivalenol. Its cyclization reaction to trichodiene is catalyzed by terpene cyclase trichodiene synthase (Tri5). This reaction is followed by several oxidation reactions catalyzed by cytochrome P450 monooxygenase (encoded by TRI4). Thereby hydroxyl groups were substituted to the carbon atoms C2, C3 and C11 and one oxygen was added to C12 and C13 facilitating the formation of an epoxide group. This results in the intermediate isotrichotriol.

In a further reaction trichotriol was gained through a shift of the C11 hydroxyl group of the isotrichotriol to the C9, similar the double bond shifted from C9=C10 to C10=C11. Trichotriol reacts in a non-enzymatic cyclization reaction to its isomere isotrichodermol. In the reaction the hydroxyl group on the C2 of the cyclopentane binds to the C11 of the cyclohexene forming a tetrahydropyran ring. The shifted OH-group at C9 is lost during the reaction. An acetyltransferase (encoded by TRI101) catalyzes the acetylation of the C3 OH-group of isotrichodermol forming isotrichdermin.

Isotrichodermin is converted to 15-decalonecitrin due to a substitution (encoded by TRI11) of one hydrogen by one hydroxyl at C15 which is then acetylated under help of TRI3. The same substitution and following acetylation reactions occur at C4 again under the control of TRI13 and TRI7. TRI1 in F. sporotrichiodies further catalyzes the addition of a fourth OH-group at C8 and a fifth OH-group at C7 at which then the hydrogen is eliminated and a keto group forms.

In a last step an esterase controlled by TRI8 catalyzes the deacetylation at C3, C4 and C15 resulting in the end product nivalenol. A partly alternative synthesis can occur when the catalysts TRI1 and TRI13, TRI7 are used in opposite order. Then the addition of the hydroxyl groups at C7 and C8 controlled by TRI1 are happening with calonectrin as reactant. In this reaction 7,8-dihydroxycalonectrin is formed. It further reacts spontaneously to 3,15-acetyl-deoxynivalenol via elimination of a hydrogen and formation of a keto-group at C8. The addition of a hydroxyl group at C4 controlled by TRI13 occurs and is acetylated under the help of TRI7. This yields 3,4,15-triacetylnivalenol (3,4,15-triANIV) from which it is than again the same synthesis as described above.

== Mechanism of action ==
Nivalenol causes a change in a number of different biological pathways. The most well known and probably important, is the NF-κB pathway. NF-κB is a transcription factor that can be found in almost all human cells, and regulates the expression of its target genes by binding to specific motifs on the genomic DNA on regulatory elements. In vitro tests have shown, that nivalenol can change the expression of cytokines, which are important controller molecules of the immune system. Nivalenol induced the secretion of IL-8, a mediator of inflammation. When treated with an NF-κB inhibitor, IL-8 secretion was lowered. Another important factor influenced by nivalenol is MCP-1/CCL2, this cytokine plays a role in the mobility regulation of mononuclear leukocyte cells. Nivalenol causes CCL2 secretion to be lowered, and thus the mobility of monocytes to be reduced. This explains part of the immunosuppressive nature of nivalenol. Again, this effect is reduced by NF-κB inhibition which shows, that nivalenol and NF-κB interact to influence the cell.

It was shown that while deoxynivalenol induces the secretion of chemokines, which are also immunorelevant messenger molecules, nivalenol does inhibit their secretion. Nivalenol also upregulates the expression of proinflammatory genes in macrophages, displaying a mixed effect on different cell types. It does so even at cytotoxic levels.

Another mechanism of cytotoxicity of nivalenol is the apoptotic cytotoxicity showing that nivalenol is more toxic than its often co-occurring mycotoxin partner deoxynivalenol, and does so by causing DNA damage and apoptosis. Nivalenol is also known to influence human leukocyte proliferation. It has been shown that nivalenol can change proliferation rates of human leukocytes in a dose dependent manner. Lower concentrations are known to enhance leukocyte proliferation, while higher concentrations decrease proliferation in a dose dependent manner.

== Metabolism ==
Structure of de-epoxynivalenol

Nivalenol in mice is not only metabolized through the liver but also, for a lesser part through microbial detoxification in the intestines. Thereby especially the epoxide group as most toxic part of the molecule is degraded. This happens by eliminating the oxygen of the epoxide group resulting in a double carbon-carbon bond between C12 and C13. This double bond is nonpolar and very stable leading to a less reactive form of nivalenol called de-epoxynivalenol. The de-epoxinated nivalenol gained is therefore much less toxic, same as every de-epoxinated trichodiene, and can be segregated into the urine without having much toxic effects anymore (nearly non-toxic).

In the urine of tested mice and pigs 80% of the de-epoxidated compound and only 7% of the actual nivalenol were found showing a high metabolising rate of the trichodienes. Thereby a low concentration of nitrogen in low proteins and urea were observed whereas the cholesterol concentration was observed to be higher than normal. This suggests that nivalenol is present and later degraded in the liver as the liver is responsible for the segregation of cholesterol into the bloodstream. The higher amount of cholesterol in the blood leads then to a higher amount of filtered cholesterol by the kidneys and eventually to an increased concentration in the urea.

The lowered concentration of amides is assumed to be caused in the degradation process of the reactive epoxide group. Therefore, the epoxides are often found to react with amides or amide groups by adding a hydroxyl group at a primary or secondary amine. As a consequence the epoxide group is degraded and less nitrogen is present for the synthesis of proteins or urea.

== Adverse effects ==
Nivalenol did not yet find usage in medical treatments, and therefore it does not have known adverse effects besides the toxic effects described. It is however worth noting that it could be interesting for investigation due to its immunosuppressive effects.

== Effects on animals and efficacy ==
As nivalenol is a mycotoxic product of certain Fusarium species it is often found in infected wheat and grain. As unprocessed wheat and grain product are often used as feed for livestock animals these are at a higher risk of nivalenol intake.

Toxicity studies in swine that received a dose of 0.05 mg nivalenol/kg body weight twice daily showed no lethal effects. Most nivalenol was secreted with the feces and did not reach the bloodstream despite the fact that there was still nivalenol upstage over the intestines after 16 hours of feeding. There were further no nivalenol metabolites found in feces or urine within the first three days. After a week of exposure to 2.5 or 5 mg of nivalenol per kg of body weight twice a day, a microbiological adaptation was seen as nivalenol metabolites (de-epoxidated nivalenol) could be found in feces and urine.

In rats and mice nivalenol showed to be toxic with adverse effects of growth retardation and leukopenia already noticed at lowest doses of 0.7 mg/kg of body weight per day. Lethal doses were dependent on the route of administration/intake of nivalenol. As nivalenol is normally taken up with feed the LD_{50} of oral administration which is 38.9 mg/kg of body weight per day in mice and 19.5 mg/kg per day in rats can be used as standard. The LD_{50} of intravenous, intraperitoneal and subcutaneous (SC) is between 7 and 7.5 mg/kg bw per day.

== Toxicity, indications and side effects ==
The toxicity of nivalenol in humans is for the most parts unknown yet, but it was investigated in mice, rats and hamster cells. Thereby the toxicity was divided in the following topics: acute/subacute, subchronic, chronic and carcinogenicity, genotoxicity, developmental toxicity studies and studies on reproduction, immunotoxicity/hematotoxycity and effects on nervous system.

=== Acute/subacute toxicity ===
The oral LD_{50} of nivalenol was found to be 38.9 mg/kg bw in mice whereas the intraperitoneal, subcutaneous and intravenous routes of exposure gave LD_{50} values of 5–10 mg/kg bw. In mice already within 3 days the most deaths occurred after oral exposure through marked congestion and haemorrhage in intestine, in acute toxicity also lymphoid organs are included. Nivalenol given over time periods of 24 days in lower doses (ca. 3,5 mg/kg bw) showed significant erythropenia and slight leukopenia.

=== Subchronic toxicity ===
The subchronic toxicity was tested by feeding mice with a daily dose of 0 to 3.5 mg nivalenol/ kg bw for 4 or 12 weeks. The observations after 4 weeks were reduced body weight and food consumption. The reduction in body weight can be explained by statistical decrease in organ weight in thymus, spleen and kidneys. Whereas the consumption time was less for female mice in comparison to male mice. After 12 weeks the toxin consumption resulted in reduction of relative organ weight in both males and females. Hereby only the liver was affected and no histopathological changes were observed.

=== Chronic toxicity and carcinogenicity ===
Female mice were fed with different doses of nivalenol (0, 0.7, 1.4 or 3.5 mg nivalenol /kg bw) for one or two years to investigate whether nivalenol is chronic toxic and/or carcinogenic. Also during this study a decrease in body weight and feed consumption was observed. The absolute weight of both liver and kidney was decreased through the two highest doses. The mice fed for one year with nivalenol (also with the lower doses) were affected with severe leukopenia whereas the mice fed for two years had no differences in count of white blood cells. Also "no histopathological changes including tumours were found in liver, thymus, spleen, kidneys, stomach, adrenal glands, pituitary glands, ovaries, bone marrow, lymph node, brain and small intestines with or without Peyer's patch". The lowest doses (0.7 mg nivalenol /kg bw) inhibited the growth and caused leukopenia. "A no observable adverse effect level (NOAEL) could not be derived from these studies. IARC (1993) concluded that there is inadequate evidence of carcinogenicity of nivalenol in experimental animals. No human data were available. The overall conclusion was that the carcinogenicity was not classifiable (group 3)".

=== Genotoxicity ===
It was found that nivalenol effects the genes of Chinese hamster V79 (CHO) cells by slightly increased frequencies of chromosomal aberrations and sister chromatid exchange. The DNA was damaged in CHO cells as well as in mice. In mice (given 20 mg nivalenol /kg bw orally or 3.7 mg /kg bw ip) the DNA of kidney, bone marrow, stomach, jejunum and colon was damaged. The DNA of the thymus and liver was not effected. In organs with DNA damage no necrotic changes were found upon histopathological examination. It can be concluded that an adequate evaluation of the genotoxicity is not allowed based on the available data.

=== Developmental toxicity and studies on reproduction ===
For developmental and reproduction studies pregnant mice were injected with different amounts of purified nivalenol on days 7–15 of gestation and for one additional study with mouldy rice containing nivalenol. The studies showed that the toxin is embryotoxic in mice. No evidence of teratogenicity was given. "The LOAEL in reproduction studies with nivalenol given by oral exposure was stated to be 1.4 mg/kg bw given in the feed throughout gestation and 5 mg/kg bw when given by gavage on days 7–15". Data from other species and on reproductive effects in adult males and females are not provided yet.

=== Immunotoxicity/haematotoxicity ===
Acute toxicity of nivalenol induces bone marrow toxicity and toxicity of lymphoid organs. Long-term exposure may result in erythropenia and leukopenia. In mice it was also observed that nivalenol increased the presence of serum IgA, "accompanied by immunopathological changes in kidneys analogous to human IgA-nephropathy". The blastogenesis in cultured human lymphocytes, proliferation of human male and female lymphocytes stimulated with phytoheamagglutin and pokeweed and immunoglobulin production induced by pokeweed, are inhibited by nivalenol. The effects of nivalenol are in the same range as same doses of deoxynivalenol, whereas the T-2 toxin are 100 fold more toxic. An additive effect is gained by combination of nivalenol with T-2 toxin, 4,15-diacetoxyscirpenol or deoxynivalenol.

=== Effects on nervous system ===
About the nervous system no data has been provided yet.
