= Sesquiterpene cyclase =

Sesquiterpene cyclase may refer to:

- Delta-cadinene synthase, an enzyme
- Aristolochene synthase, an enzyme
- Trichodiene synthase, an enzyme
