= Trichothecene =

Large family of chemically related mycotoxins

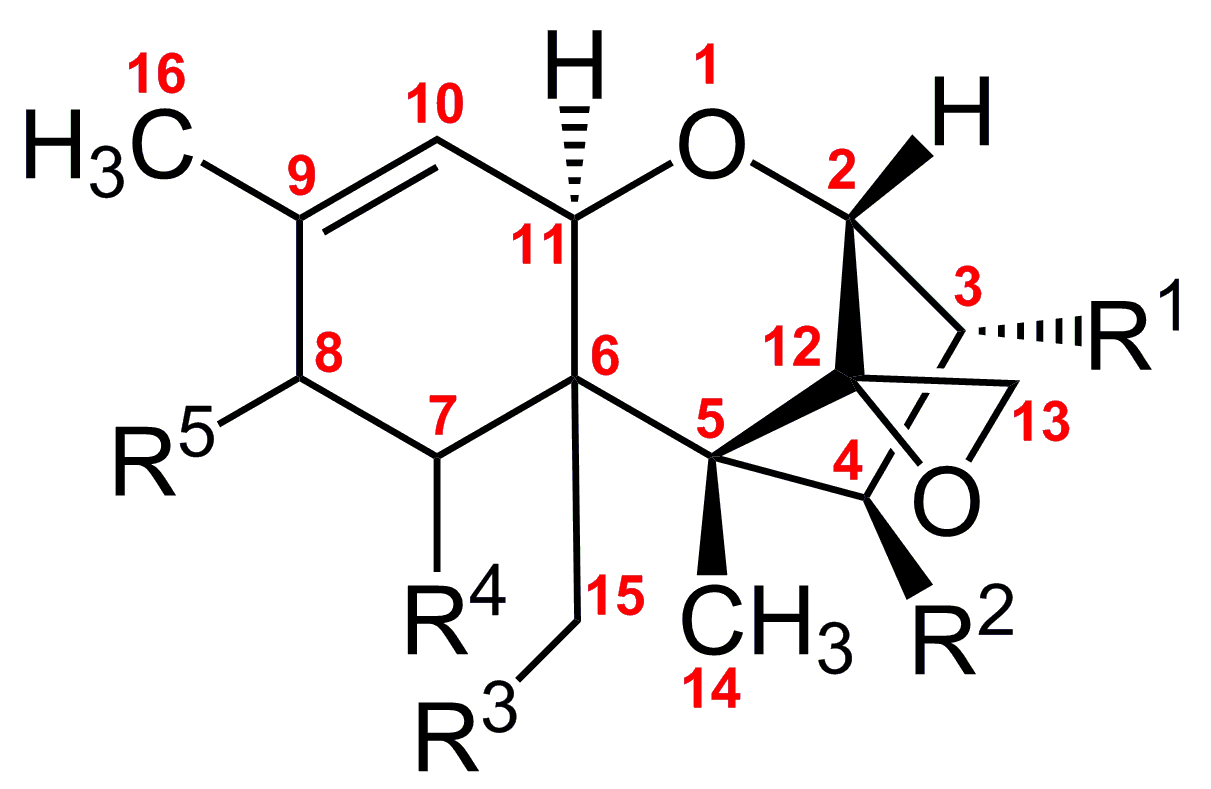
Chemical structure of the trichothecene core

Trichothecenes constitute a large group of chemically related mycotoxins. They are produced by fungi of the genera Fusarium, Myrothecium, Trichoderma, Trichothecium, Cephalosporium, Verticimonosporium and Stachybotrys. Chemically, trichothecenes are a class of sesquiterpenes.

All trichothecenes share a cyclic terpene core but differ in the type of functional groups (R groups) attached to the carbon backbone. They are produced on many different grains such as wheat, oats, or maize by various Fusarium species including F. graminearum, F. sporotrichioides, F. poae, and F. equiseti.

Some moulds that produce trichothecene mycotoxins, such as Stachybotrys chartarum, can grow in damp indoor environments. It has been found that macrocyclic trichothecenes produced by S. chartarum can become airborne and thus contribute to health problems in humans.

Trichoderma cornu-damae (syn. Podostroma cornu-damae), a mushroom native to Asia, contains potentially fatal levels of satratoxin H.

== Classification ==
=== General classification ===
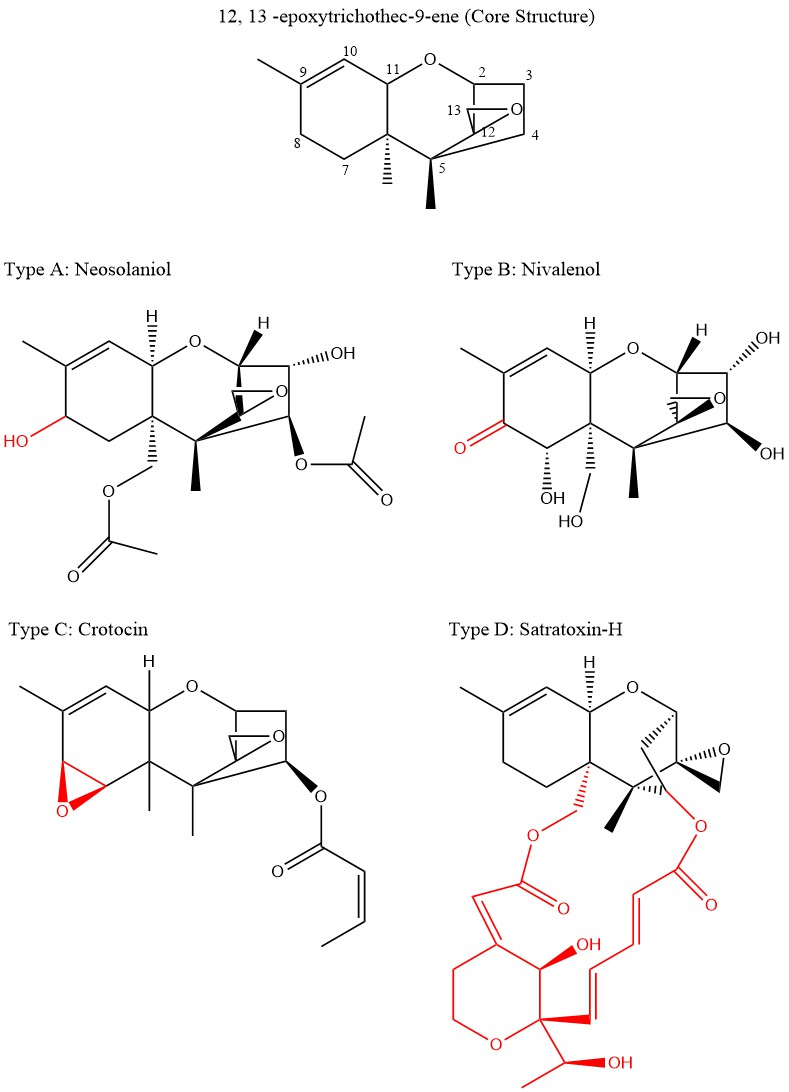
The core structure of all major trichothecenes with major examples from each classification type. Identifying functional groups for the classification type are highlighted in red.

Trichothecenes are a group of over 150 chemically related toxic mycotoxins. Each trichothecene displays a core structure consisting of a six-membered ring containing a single oxygen atom, flanked by two carbon rings. This core ring structure contains an epoxide bridging carbons 12 and 13, as well as a double bond between carbons 9 and 10. These two functional groups are primarily responsible for trichothecenes' ability to inhibit protein synthesis and incur general cytotoxic effects. Notably, this core structure is amphipathic, containing both polar and nonpolar parts. All trichothecenes are related through this common structure but are differentiated by the substitution pattern of oxygen-containing functional groups on carbons 3, 4, 7, 8, and 15. These functional groups govern the properties of an individual trichothecene and also serve as the basis for the most commonly used classification system for this family of toxins. This classification system breaks up the trichothecene family into four groups: Type A, B, C, and D.

- Type A trichothecenes have hydroxyl or O-linked ester substitutions around the core ring structure. Common examples of these are neosolaniol with a hydroxyl substitution at carbon 8, and T-2 toxin with an ester substitution at carbon 8.
- Type B trichothecenes are classified by the presence of oxo-substitutions around the core ring structure. Common examples of these include nivalenol and deoxynivalenol, which both have a ketone functional group at carbon 8.
- Type C trichothecenes have an additional epoxide bridging the carbons 7 and 8. A common example of this is crotocin, which also has an O-linked ester functional group at carbon 4.
- Type D trichothecenes have an additional macrocylic ring between carbon 4 and carbon 15. These rings can have varied additional functional groups. Common examples of these are roridin A and satratoxin H.

Although the distinct functional groups of these classification types give each trichothecene unique chemical properties, their classification type does not explicitly indicate their relative toxicity. While the type D group is thought to contain the most toxic trichothecenes, type A and B trichothecenes vary considerably in their toxicity.

=== Alternative classifications ===
The classification system described above is the most commonly used to group molecules of the trichothecene family. However, a variety of alternative classification systems also exist for these complex molecules. Trichothecenes can also be generally described as simple or macrocyclic. Simple trichothecenes include types A, B, and C, whereas macrocyclic trichothecenes include Type D and are characterized by the presence of a carbon 4 – carbon 15 bridge. Additionally, J. F. Grove proposed a classification of trichothecenes into three groups that was also based upon the functional substitution patterns of the ring skeleton. Group 1 trichothecenes only have functional groups substituted on the third, fully saturated carbon ring. Group 2 trichothecenes contain additional functional groups on the core ring containing the 9, 10 carbon double bond. Finally, group 3 trichothecenes contain a ketone functional group at carbon 8; this is the same criteria for type B trichothecenes.

Advances in the field of evolutionary genetics have also led to the proposal of trichothecene classification systems based on the pathway of their biosynthesis. Genes responsible for the biosynthesis of a mycotoxin are typically located in clusters; in Fusariumi these are known as TRI genes. TRI genes are each responsible for producing an enzyme that carries out a specific step in the biosynthesis of trichothecenes. Mutations in these genes can lead to the production of variant trichothecenes and therefore these molecules could be grouped based on shared biosynthesis steps. For example, a shared step in the biosynthesis of trichothecenes is controlled by the gene TRI4. This enzyme product controls the addition of either three or four oxygen atoms to trichodiene to form either isotrichodiol or isotrichotriol respectively. A variety of trichothecenes can then be synthesized from either of these intermediates and they could therefore be classified as either t-type if synthesized from isotrichotriol or d-type if synthesized from isotrichodiol.

== Mechanism of action ==
Trichothecenes accelerate reactive oxygen species production in cells, which in turn mediates the induction of the programmed cell death pathway in cells

The toxicity of trichothecenes is primarily due to their action as protein synthesis inhibitors; this inhibition occurs at ribosomes during all three stages of protein synthesis: initiation, elongation, and termination. During initiation, trichothecenes can either inhibit the association of the two ribosomal subunits or inhibit the function of the mature ribosome by preventing the association of the first tRNA with the start codon. Inhibition at elongation most likely occurs due to trichothecenes preventing the function of peptidyl transferase, the enzyme which catalyzes the formation of new peptide bonds on the 60s ribosomal subunit. Inhibition during termination can also be the result of peptidyl transferase inhibition or the ability of trichothecenes to prevent the hydrolysis required at this final step.

The substitution pattern of the ring core of trichothecenes influences the toxin's action as either an inhibitor of initiation or as an inhibitor of elongation/termination. Trichothecenes may also affect general cellular enzyme function as the 12,13-epoxy moiety is susceptible to nucleophilic attack by active-site thiol groups.

These toxic effects are seen most dramatically in actively proliferating cells such as in the gastrointestinal tract or the bone marrow.

In addition to its effects on protein sysnthesis, it is likely that the trichothecene T-2 toxin also directly affects oxidative metabolism causing mitochondrial dysfunction.

In most eukaryotes, such as humans, energy is primarily produced in mitochondria through the oxidation of carbon and the reduction of oxygen via the electron transport chain. A small percentage of electrons commonly leak from this process, typically 0.2-2% resulting in generation of reactive oxygen species and reactive nitrogen species. These chemical species are highly reactive and result in damage to DNA, proteins, and other proteins through a process called oxidative stress.

T-2 toxin rapidly increases the leakage of electrons from the electron transport system, which corresponds with increased reactive oxygen species and oxidative stress in affected cells. This oxidative stress ultimately triggerrs programmed cell-death, apoptosis, via the intrinsic pathway.

Additionally, trichothecenes such as T-2 have also been shown to increase the c-Jun N-Terminal Kinase signaling pathway in cells. Here, c-Jun N-Terminal Kinase is able to increase to phosphorylation of its target, c-Jun, into its active form. Activated c-jun acts as a transcription factor in the cell nucleus for proteins important for facilitating the downstream apoptotic pathway.

== Toxicity ==
The trichothecene mycotoxins are toxic to humans, other mammals, birds, fish, a variety of invertebrates, plants, and eukaryotic cells. The specific toxicity varies depending on the particular toxin and animal species, however the route of administration plays a significantly higher role in determining lethality. The effects of poisoning will depend on the concentration of exposure, length of time and way the person is exposed. Exposure to a concentrated solution or aerosolized toxin is more likely to cause severe effects, including death. Upon consumption, the toxin inhibits ribosomal protein, DNA and RNA synthesis, mitochondrial functions cell division while simultaneously activating a cellular stress response named ribotoxic stress response. The trichothecene mycotoxins can be absorbed though topical, oral, and inhalational routes.

Trichothecenes differ from most other potential weapon toxins since they can act through the skin, which is attributed to their amphipathic and lipophilic characteristics. The small amphipathic nature of trichothecenes allows them to easily cross cell membranes and interact with different organelles such as the mitochondria, endoplasmic reticulum (ER). and chloroplast The lipophilic nature of trichothecenes allow them to be easily absorbed through skin pulmonary mucosa, and gut. Direct dermal application or oral ingestion of trichothecene causes rapid irritation to the skin or intestinal mucosa. As a dermal irritant and blistering agent, it is alleged to be 400 times more intoxicating than sulfur mustard.

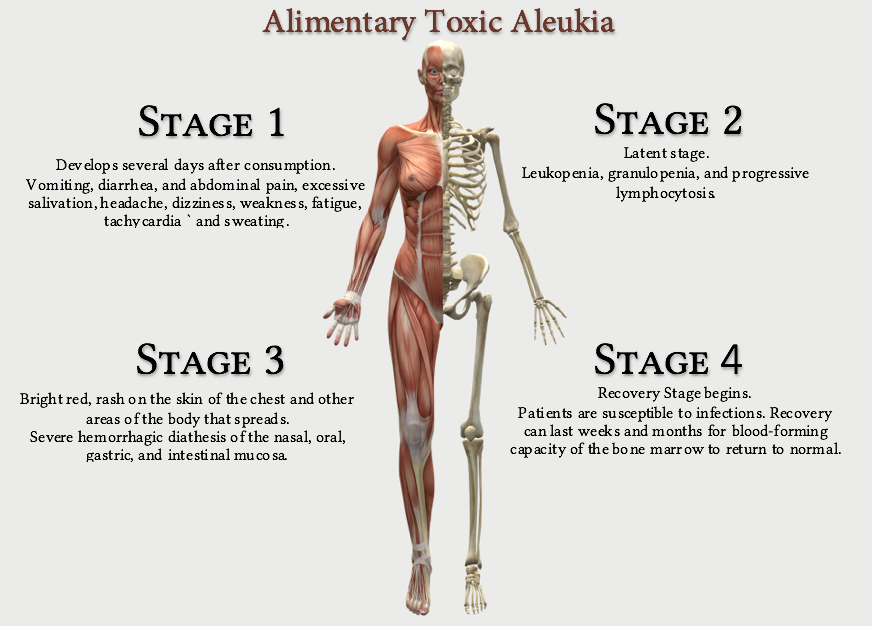
Alimentary toxic aleukia response stages

The response in the body to the mycotoxin, alimentary toxic aleukia, occurs several days after consumption, in four stages:

1. The first stage includes inflammation of the gastric and intestinal mucosa.
2. The second stage is characterized by leukopenia, granulopenia, and progressive lymphocytosis.
3. The third stage is characterized by the appearance of a red rash on the skin of the body, as well as hemorrhage of the skin and mucosa. If severe, aphonia and death by strangulation can occur.
4. By the fourth stage, cells in the lymphoid organs and erythropoiesis in the bone marrow and spleen are depleted and immune response is down.

Infection can be triggered by an injury as minor as a cut, scratch, or abrasion.

The following symptoms are exhibited:

- Severe itching and redness of the skin, sores, shedding of the skin
- Distortion of any of the senses, loss of the ability to coordinate muscle movement
- Nausea, vomiting and diarrhea
- Nose and throat pain, discharge from the nose, itching and sneezing
- Coughing, difficulty breathing, wheezing, chest pain and spitting up blood
- Temporary bleeding disorders
- Elevated body temperature

== Regulatory issues ==
When it comes to animal and human food, type A trichothecenes (e.g. T-2 toxin, HT-2 toxin, diacetoxyscirpenol) are of special interest because they are more toxic than the other foodborne trichothecenes, e.g. type B group (e.g. deoxynivalenol, nivalenol, 3- and 15-acetyldeoxynivalenol). However, deoxynivalenol is of concern as it is the most prevalent trichothecene in Europe. The major effects of trichothecenes are reduced feed uptake, vomiting, and immuno-suppression.

Relatively few countries, primarily in the European Union, have recommended maximum limits for these mycotoxins in food and animal feed. However, trichothecenes are often tested for elsewhere, in order to prevent them from entering the food chain and to prevent losses in animal production.

== History ==
Trichothecenes are believed to have been discovered in 1932 in Orenburg, Russia, during World War II, by the Soviet Union. Around 100,000 people (60% mortality rate) began to suffer and die from alimentary toxic aleukia, a lethal disease with symptoms resembling radiation poisoning. It is believed that the Soviet civilians had become ill from ingesting contaminated bread, and inhaling mold through contaminated hay, dusts, and ventilation systems. The culprit is believed to be the toxins Fusarium sporotrichioides and Fusarium poae which are high producers of T-2 toxin. Fusarium species are probably the most commonly cited and among the most abundant of the trichothecene-producing fungi.

Trichothecenes make an ideal biological warfare agent, being lethal and inexpensive to produce in large quantities, stable as an aerosol for dispersion, and without effective vaccination/treatment. Evidence suggests that mycotoxins have already been utilized in biological warfare.

- 1964 there are unconfirmed reports that Egyptian or Russian forces used T-2 with mustard gas
- 1974–1981 "yellow rain" incidents in southeast Asia (Laos, Cambodia) and Afghanistan
- 1975 and 1981 during the Vietnam War, the Soviet Union was alleged to have provided mycotoxins to the armies of Vietnam and Laos for use against resistance forces in Laos and Cambodia
- 1979–1989 during the Soviet-Afghan War
- 1985–1989 Iran–Iraq War, scattered reports of mycotoxin shipments to Iraq

Since then, trichothecenes have been reported throughout the world. They have had a significant economic impact on the world due to loss of human and animal life, increased health care and veterinary care costs, reduced livestock production, disposal of contaminated foods and feeds, and investment in research and applications to reduce severity of the mycotoxin problem. These mycotoxins account for millions of dollars annually in losses, due to factors that are often beyond human control (environmental, ecological, or storage method).

== Food contamination ==
Hazardous concentrations of trichothecenes have been detected in corn, wheat, barley, oats, rice, rye, vegetables, and other crops. Diseases resulting from infection include seed rot, seedling blight, root rot, stalk rot, and ear rot. Trichothecenes are also common contaminants of poultry feeds and their adverse effects on poultry health and productivity have been studied extensively.

Several studies have shown that optimal conditions for fungal growth are not necessarily optimum for toxin production. Toxin production is greatest with high humidity and temperatures of 6–24 °C. The fungal propagation and production is enhanced in tropical conditions with high temperatures and moisture levels; monsoons, flash floods and unseasoned rains during harvest. Trichothecenes have been detected in air samples suggesting that they can be aerosolized on spores or small particles

Natural occurrence of TCT has been reported in Asia, Africa, South America, Europe, and North America

- Akakabibyo, a disease of similar etiology, has also been associated with trichothecene contaminated grains in Japan.
- In China, cereals or their products contaminated with trichothecenes including DON, T-2 toxin, and NIV, have also been associated with outbreaks of gastrointestinal disorders.
- In Yugoslavia, studies on mycotoxigenic fungi in raw milk have indicated that 91% of the samples tested were contaminated
- In the US, a study was conducted in seven Midwestern states in 1988–1989 and found mycotoxins in 19.5–24.7% of corn samples. Since the early 1900s, the occurrence of emesis in animals and humans after consumption of cereals infected with Fusarium species have been described.
- In a study in the Bihar region of India from 1985 to 1987, 51% of the samples tested were contaminated with molds.
- In another study in the Bihar region, high levels were reported in groundnut meal used for dairy cattle.
- In Ludhiana and Punjab researchers found 75% of samples from dairy farms contaminated.
- In India, estimated 10 million dollars were lost due to groundnut contamination with mycotoxins.

== Safety ==
There are no known direct antidotes to trichothecene exposure. Therefore, risk management in contaminated areas is primarily defined by the treatment of exposure symptoms as well as prevention of future exposure.

=== Treatment ===
Typical routes of exposure to trichothecene toxins include topical absorption, ingestion, and inhalation. Severity of symptoms depends on the dose and type of exposure, but treatment is primarily focused on supporting bodily systems damaged by the mycotoxin. The first step in most exposure cases is to remove potentially contaminated clothing and to flush the sites of exposure thoroughly with water. This prevents the victim from repeated exposure. Fluids and electrolytes can be given to victims with high levels of gastrointestinal damage to mitigate the effects of reduced tract absorption. Fresh air and assisted respiration can also be administered upon the development of mild respiratory distress. Increasingly severe symptoms can require the application of advanced medical assistance. The onset of leukopenia, or reduction of white blood cell count, can be treated with a plasma or platelet transfusion. Hypotension can be treated with the administration of norepinephrine or dopamine. Development of severe cardiopulmonary distress may require intubation and additional drug treatments to stabilize heart and lung activity.

Additionally, there are a variety of chemicals that can indirectly reduce the damaging effects of trichothecenes on cells and tissues. Activated charcoal solutions are frequently administered to ingestion cases as an adsorbent. Here, the charcoal acts as a porous substance for the toxin to bind, preventing its absorption through the gastrointestinal tract and increasing its removal from the body through bowel excretion. Similar detoxifying adsorbents can also be added to animal feed upon contamination to reduce the bioavailability of the toxin upon consumption. Antioxidants are also useful in mitigating the damaging effects of trichothecenes in response to the increase of reactive oxygen species they produce in cells. Generally, a good diet rich in probiotics, vitamins and nutrients, proteins, and lipids is thought to be effective in reducing the symptoms of trichothecene poisoning. For example, vitamin E was found to counteract the formation of lipid peroxides induced by T-2 toxin in chickens. Similarly, co-supplementation of modified glucomannans and selenium in the diets of chickens also consuming T-2 toxin, reduced the deleterious effects of toxin associated depletion of antioxidants in the liver. Despite not being a direct antidote, these antioxidants may be critical in reducing the severity of trichothecene exposures.

=== Prevention ===
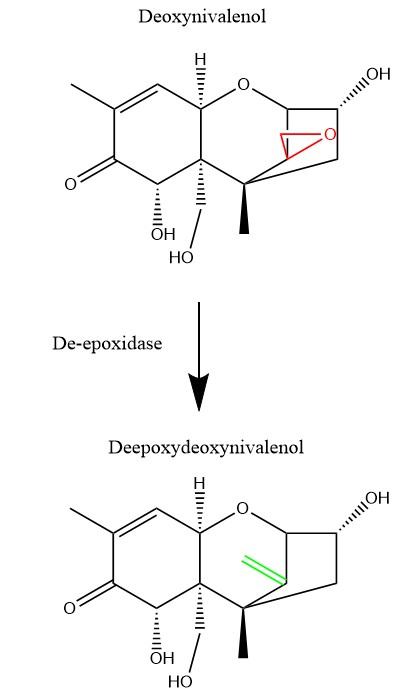
Biological approach to trichothecene decontamination. De-epoxidases are capable of reducing epoxide rings (red) to double bond groups (green) which significantly reduces the toxicity of trichothecenes.

Trichothecenes are mycotoxins produced by molds that frequently contaminate stores of grain products. This makes trichothecene contamination a significant public health problem, and many areas have strict limits on permitted trichothecene content. For example, in the European Union, only .025 ppm of T-2 toxin is permissible in bakery products intended for human consumption. The molds that can produce trichothecenes grow well in dark, temperate places with high moisture content. Therefore, one of the best ways to prevent trichothecene contamination in food products is to store the resources in the proper conditions to prevent the growth of molds. For example, it is generally advised to only store grains in areas with a moisture content of less than 15%. However, if an area has already been contaminated with trichothecene toxins, there are a variety of possible decontamination strategies to prevent further exposure. Treatment with 1% sodium hypochlorite (NaOCl) in 0.1M sodium hydroxide (NaOH) for 4–5 hours has been shown to inhibit the biological activity of T-2 toxin. Incubation with aqueous ozone at approximately 25 ppm has also been shown to degrade a variety of trichothecenes through a mechanism involving oxidation of the 9, 10 carbon double bond. UV exposure has also been shown to be effective under the right conditions.

Outside of the strategies for physical and chemical decontamination, advancing research in molecular genetics has also given rise to the potential of a biological decontamination approach. Many microbes, including bacteria, yeast, and fungi, have evolved enzymatic gene products which facilitate the specific and efficient degradation of trichothecene mycotoxins. Many of these enzymes specifically degrade the 12,13 carbon epoxide ring which is important for the toxicity of trichothecenes. For example, the Eubacteria strain BBSH 797 produces de-epoxidase enzymes which reduce the 12,13 carbon epoxide ring to a double bond group. These, along with other microbes expressing trichothecene detoxifying properties, can be used in feed stores to prevent to toxic effect of contaminated feed upon consumption. Furthermore, molecular cloning of the genes responsible for producing these detoxifying enzymes could be useful in producing strains of agricultural products that are resistant to trichothecene poisoning.

== Epoxy trichothecenes ==
Epoxy trichothecenes are a variation of the above, and were once explored for military use in East Germany, and possibly the whole Soviet bloc. There is no feasible treatment once symptoms of epoxithichothecene poisoning set in, though the effects can subside without leaving any permanent damage.

Any plans to use the epoxy trichothecenes as a large-scale bioweapon were abandoned. They broke down quickly in the presence of heat, UV light, and chlorine. This meant they would be ineffective or quick to remediate in open attacks or water supply poisoning, where it might be exposed to sunlight, boiled, or conditioned with chlorine.
