= Pancytopenia =

- Specialty: Hematology

Pancytopenia is a medical condition in which there is significant reduction in the number of almost all blood cells (red blood cells, white blood cells, platelets, monocytes, lymphocytes, etc.).

If only two parameters from the complete blood count are low, the term bicytopenia can be used. The diagnostic approach is the same as for pancytopenia.

== Causes ==
Iatrogenic causes of pancytopenia include chemotherapy for malignancies if the drug or drugs used cause bone marrow suppression. Rarely, drugs (antibiotics, blood pressure medication, heart medication) can cause pancytopenia. For example, the antibiotic chloramphenicol can cause pancytopenia in some individuals.

Rarely, pancytopenia may have other causes, such as mononucleosis or other viral diseases. Increasingly, HIV is itself a cause of pancytopenia.

- Familial hemophagocytic syndrome
- Aplastic anemia
- Gaucher's disease
- Metastatic carcinoma of bone
- Multiple Myeloma
- Overwhelming infections
- Lymphoma
- Myelofibrosis
- Dyskeratosis congenita
- Myelodysplastic syndrome
- Leukemia
- Leishmaniasis
- Severe folate or vitamin B12 deficiency
- Systemic lupus erythematosus
- Paroxysmal nocturnal hemoglobinuria (blood test)
- Viral infections (such as HIV, EBV; an undetermined virus is most common)
- Alimentary toxic aleukia
- Copper deficiency
- Pernicious anemia
- Medication
- Hypersplenism
- Osteopetrosis
- Organic acidurias (Propionic Acidemia, Methylmalonic Aciduria, Isovaleric Aciduria)
- Low dose arsenic poisoning
- Sako disease (Myelodysplastic-cytosis)
- Chronic radiation sickness
- LIG4 syndrome

== Mechanism ==
The mechanism of pancytopenia involves either haemopoiesis itself, decreasing blood cell productions in number (aplastic anemia), haemopoietic stem cells are displaced by malignant cells (Leukemia, lymphoma, MDS) or they are being pooled (sequestrated) (spleen)/destroyed (immune) outside bone marrow. The mechanisms for pancytopenia differ according to the etiology. For example, in hemophagocytic lymphohistiocytosis (HLH) there is marked inappropriate and ineffective T cell activation that leads to an increased hemophagocytic activity. The T cell activated macrophages engulf erythrocytes, leukocytes, platelets, as well as their progenitor cells. Along with pancytopenia, HLH is characterized by fever, splenomegaly, and hemophagocytosis in bone marrow, liver, or lymph nodes.

== Diagnosis ==
Pancytopenia usually requires a bone marrow biopsy in order to distinguish among different causes.

- anemia: hemoglobin < 13.5 g/dL (male) or < 12 g/dL (female).
- leukopenia: total white cell count < 4.0 billion/L. Decrease in all types of white blood cells (revealed by doing a differential count).
- thrombocytopenia: platelet count < 150 billion/L.

== Treatment ==
Treatment is done to address the underlying cause. To tide over immediate crisis blood transfusion with packed red blood cells (PRBC) or platelet transfusion may be done. Sometimes there are obvious clinical clues to suggest underlying B12 deficiency for a cause of pancytopenia. In this selected cases even with severe anemia blood product transfusions can be avoided and vitamin B12 treatment itself suffice. In other situations like acute leukemia, Myelodysplastic syndrome, aplastic anemia etc. disease specific therapy is needed.
