= Abraham Z. Joffe =

Israeli biologist

Abraham Z. Joffe (Hebrew: אברהם ג'ופי; 1909–2000) was Professor of Mycology and Mycotoxicology at the Hebrew University, Jerusalem.

Joffe's professional interests were centered primarily in toxigenic fungi associated with production of mycotoxins (aflatoxins, trichothecenes, and other toxins); ecology and environmental factors favoring formation and distribution of Fusarium mycotoxins in cereal grains, feeds and foods; and phytotoxic action of Fusarium strains, and their toxicity in animals and humans.

Joffe is the author of over 130 scientific papers, reviews and monographs. He was a member of several professional associations, a participant in numerous International Conferences and Symposia, and holds two Certificates of Merit from the U.S. Department of Agriculture and the Ministry of Health of the USSR.

Joffe received his PhD in Mycology and Mycotoxicology at the Institute of Botany, U.S.S.R Academy of Science in Leningrad (1950). He is a member of the Joffe family.

== Bibliography ==
- Joffe A. Z. (1947a). The mycoflora of normal and overwintered cereals in 1943-1944. In Alimentary toxic aleukia. Acta Chkalov Inst Epidemiol. Microbiol. First Commun., 28-34, Orenburg, USSR.
- Joffe A. Z. (1947b). The mycoflora of normal and overwintered cereals in 1944-1945. In Alimentary toxic aleukia. Acta Chkalov Inst Epidemiol. Microbiol. Second Commun., 35-42, Orenburg, USSR.
- Joffe, A. Z. (1947c). The dynamics of toxin accumulation in overwintered cereals and their microflora in 1945-1946. In alimentary toxic aleukia.Acta Chkalov Inst. Epidemiol. Microbiol., p. 192, Orenburg. USSR (Abstr.).
- Joffe, A. Z. (1947d). Biological properties of fungi isolated from overwintered cereals. In Alimentary toxic aleukia. Acta Chkalov Inst. Epidemiol. Microbiol., p. 192 Orenburg. USSR (Abstr.)
- Joffe, A. Z. (1950). Toxicity of fungi on cereals overwintered in the field (on the etiology of alimentary toxic aleukia). Ph.D. dissertation, Institute of Botany, Academy of Science, Leningrad, USSR, p. 205.
- Joffe, A. Z. (1955). The antibiotic effect of molds of the genera Fusarium and Penicillium on the Tuberculosis baccilus. Proc. Inst. Exp. Med. Sci. Lith. SSR 3, 61-67
- Joffe, A. Z. (1956a). The etiology of alimentary toxic aleukia. In Conference on Mycotoxicoses in Human and Agricultural Animals. Kiev: Publ. Acad. Sci., pp. 36–38
- Joffe, A. Z. (1956b). The influence of overwintering on the antibiotic activity of several molds of the genus Cladosporium, Alternaria, Fusarium, Mucor, Thamnidium and Aspergillus. Acta Acad. Sci. Lith. SSR Ser. B 3, 85-95
- Joffe, A. Z. (1956c). The effect of environmental conditions on the antibiotic activity of some fungi of the genus Penicillium. Acta Acad. Sci. Lith.SSR Ser. B, 4, 101-113.
- Joffe, A. Z. (1960a). Toxicity and antibiotic properties of some Fusaria. Bull. Res. Counc. Isr. 8D,81-95.
- Joffe, A. Z. (1960b). The mycoflora of overwintered cereals and its toxicity. Bull. Res. Counc. Isr. 9D, 101-126.
- Joffe, A. Z. (1962a). Biological properties of some toxic fungi isolated from overwintered cereals. Mycopathol. Mycol. Appl. 16, 201-221.
- Joffe, A. Z. (1962b). Fusarium root rot of maize in Israel. Plant. Dis. Rep. 46, 203.
- Joffe, A. Z. (1963a). Toxicity of overwintered cereals. Plant Soil 18, 31-44.
- Joffe, A. Z. (1963b). The occurrence of Fusarium species in Israel. 2. Species of Fusarium of the section Elegans and a review of their taxonomy. Annls Inst. Natl. Agron. Contrib. Serv. Mycol. 57, 51-61.
- Joffe, A. Z. (1963c). The mycoflora of continuously cropped soil in Israel with special reference to effects of manurizing and fertilizing. Mycologia 55, 271-282.
- Joffe, A. Z. (1963d). Effect of manuring and fertilizing on the mycoflora of heavy soil in a crop rotation trial in Israel. Soil Sci. 95, 353-355.
- Joffe, A.Z. (1986) FUSARIUM SPECIES: THEIR BIOLOGY AND TOXICOLOGY. John Wiley & Sons, New York, Chichester, Brisbane, Toronto, Singapore.
