= Vomitoxin =

Fungal toxic chemical in grains

Names
- IUPAC name 3α,7α,15-Trihydroxy-12,13-epoxytrichothec-9-en-8-one
- Systematic IUPAC name (2R,2′S,3R,5R,5aR,6S,9aR)-3,8-Dihydroxy-5a-(hydroxymethyl)-5,6-dimethylspiro[[2,5]methano[1]benzoxepine-10,2′-oxiran]-7(6H)-one
- Other names Deoxynivalenol (DON); Vomitoxin

Identifiers
CAS Number	51481-10-8
3D model (JSmol)	Interactive image
ChEBI	CHEBI:10022
ChEMBL	ChEMBL513300
ChemSpider	36584
ECHA InfoCard	100.129.971
KEGG	C09747
PubChem CID	40024
UNII	JT37HYP23V
CompTox Dashboard (EPA)	DTXSID3020382
- InChI: InChI=1S/C15H20O6/c1-7-3-9-14(5-16,11(19)10(7)18)13(2)4-8(17)12(21-9)15(13)6-20-15/h3,8-9,11-12,16-17,19H,4-6H2,1-2H3/t8-,9-,11-,12-,13-,14-,15+/m1/s1 Key: LINOMUASTDIRTM-QGRHZQQGSA-N; InChI=1/C15H20O6/c1-7-3-9-14(5-16,11(19)10(7)18)13(2)4-8(17)12(21-9)15(13)6-20-15/h3,8-9,11-12,16-17,19H,4-6H2,1-2H3/t8-,9-,11-,12-,13-,14-,15+/m1/s1 Key: LINOMUASTDIRTM-QGRHZQQGBF
- SMILES: CC1=C[C@H]2O[C@@H]3[C@H](O)C[C@]([C@]2([C@H](O)C1=O)CO)([C@]13OC1)C

Properties
Chemical formula	C_{15}H_{20}O_{6}
Molar mass	296.319 g·mol^{−1}

Related compounds
Related compounds	nivalenol
- Except where otherwise noted, data are given for materials in their standard state (at 25 °C [77 °F], 100 kPa). verify (what is ?) Infobox references

Vomitoxin, also known as deoxynivalenol (DON), is a type B trichothecene, an epoxy-sesquiterpenoid. This mycotoxin occurs predominantly in grains such as wheat, barley, oats, rye, and corn, and less often in rice, sorghum, and triticale. The occurrence of deoxynivalenol is associated primarily with Fusarium graminearum (Gibberella zeae) and F. culmorum, both of which are important plant pathogens which cause fusarium head blight in wheat and gibberella or fusarium ear blight in corn. The incidence of fusarium head blight is strongly associated with moisture at the time of flowering (anthesis), and the timing of rainfall, rather than the amount, is the most critical factor. However, increased amount of moisture towards harvest time has been associated with lower amount of vomitoxin in wheat grain due to leaching of toxins. Furthermore, deoxynivalenol contents are significantly affected by the susceptibility of cultivars towards Fusarium species, previous crop, tillage practices, and fungicide use. It occurs abundantly in grains in Norway due to heavy rainfall.

F. graminearum grows optimally at a temperature of 25 °C and at a water activity above 0.88. F. culmorum grows optimally at 21 °C and at a water activity above 0.87. The geographical distribution of the two species appears to be related to temperature, F. graminearum being the more common species occurring in warmer climates. Deoxynivalenol has been implicated in incidents of mycotoxicoses in both humans and farm animals.

== Mechanism of action ==
Vomitoxin belongs to a class of mycotoxins (trichothecenes) which are strong inhibitors of protein synthesis; exposure to vomitoxin causes the brain to decrease its uptake of the amino acid tryptophan and, in turn, its synthesis of serotonin. Reduced levels of serotonin are believed to be responsible for the anorexic effects of DON and other trichothecenes. Irritation of the gastrointestinal tract may also play a role in reducing food intake, and may also partially explain the high incidence of paraesophageal stomach ulcers observed in sows during food refusal. In humans DON is extensively glucuronidated and excreted via urine.

== In food ==
When compared to other trichothecene mycotoxins which can form in grains and forages, vomitoxin is relatively mild. Reduced feed intake, with its accompanying decrease in performance, is the only symptom of vomitoxin toxicity livestock producers will likely encounter. This response to vomitoxin appears to occur through the central nervous system.

- Human foods: Vomitoxin is not a known carcinogen, unlike aflatoxin. Large amounts of grain with vomitoxin would have to be consumed to pose acute toxicity in humans. Currently, the chronic effects of low-dose exposure are unknown. The U.S. Food and Drug Administration has established a level of 1 ppm (parts per million) restriction of vomitoxin, while the Canadian Food Inspection Agency has set a legislated maximum of 2 ppm for uncleaned soft wheat for human consumption
- Companion animals: Dogs and cats are restricted to 5 ppm and of grains and grain byproducts and the grains are not to exceed 40% percent of the diet.
- Livestock and farm animals: In animals and livestock, vomitoxin causes a refusal to feed and lack of weight gain when fed above advised levels. Restrictions are set at 10 ppm for poultry and ruminating beef and feedlot cattle older than four months. Ingredients may not exceed 50% of the animal's diet. Dairy cow feed limits are set at 2 ppm.

== Biosynthesis ==
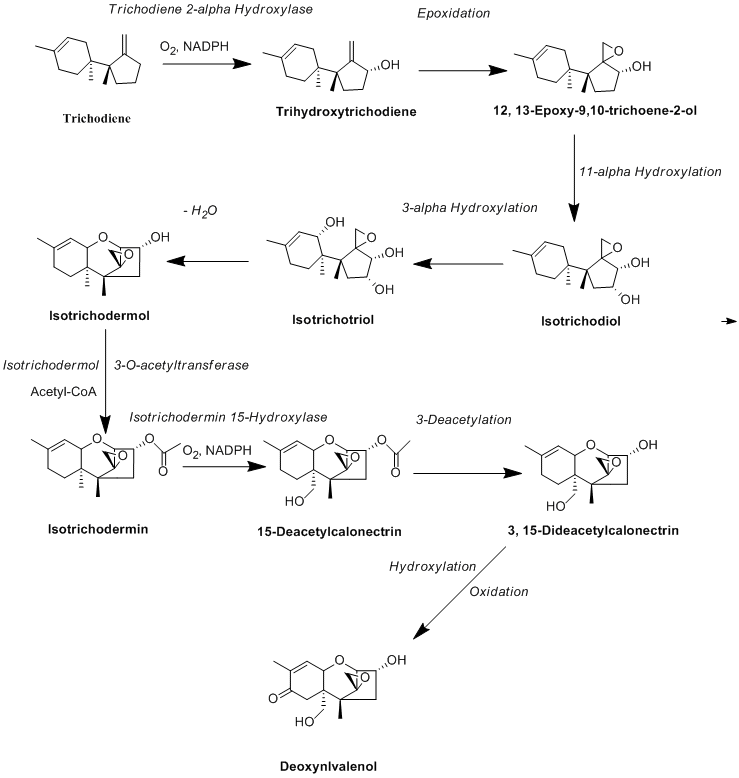
Biosynthesis of vomitoxin
