= Fusarium graminearum genome database =

Plant pathogen database

FGDB
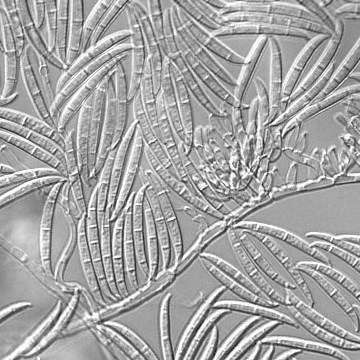

Content
- Description: genome resource on the plant pathogen Fusarium graminearum.
- Organisms: Gibberella zeae

Contact
- Research center: Technical University of Munich
- Laboratory: Chair of Genome Oriented Bioinformatics, Center of Life and Food Science
- Authors: Ulrich Güldener
- Primary citation: Güldener & al. (2006)

Access
- Website: http://mips.gsf.de/genre/proj/fusarium/.

Fusarium graminearum Genome Database (FGDB) is genomic database on Fusarium graminearum, a plant pathogen which causes the wheat headblight disease.

== See also ==
- Gibberella zeae
