= Yellow rain =

Purported chemical weapon

Yellow rain was a 1981 political incident in which the United States secretary of state Alexander Haig accused the Soviet Union of supplying T-2 mycotoxin to the communist states in Vietnam, Laos and Cambodia for use in counterinsurgency warfare. Refugees described many different forms of "attacks", including a sticky yellow liquid falling from planes or helicopters, which was dubbed "yellow rain". The U.S. government alleged that over ten thousand people had been killed in attacks using these supposed chemical weapons. The Soviets denied these claims and an initial United Nations investigation was inconclusive.

Samples of the supposed chemical agent that were supplied to a group of independent scientists turned out to be honeybee feces, suggesting that the "yellow rain" was due to mass defecation of digested pollen grains from large swarms of bees. Although the majority of the scientific literature on this topic now regards the hypothesis that yellow rain was a Soviet chemical weapon as disproved, the U.S. government has not retracted its allegations, arguing that the issue has not been fully resolved. Many of the U.S. documents relating to this incident remain classified.

== Allegations ==
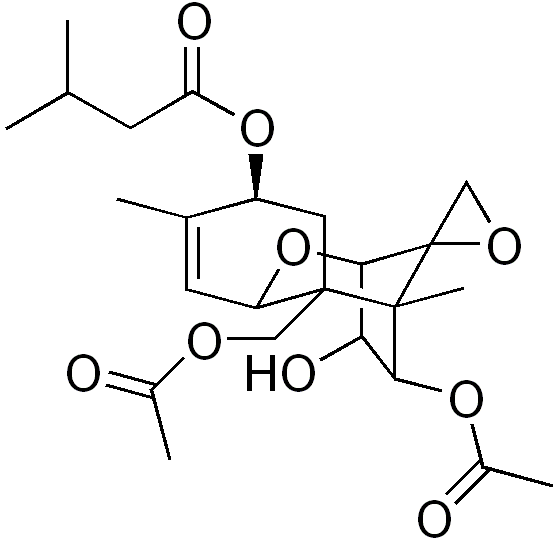
T-2 mycotoxin

The charges stemmed from events in Laos and North Vietnam beginning in 1975, when the two governments, which were allied with and supported by the Soviet Union, fought against Hmong tribes, peoples who had sided with the United States and South Vietnam during the Vietnam War. Refugees described events that they believed to be chemical warfare attacks by low-flying aircraft or helicopters; several of the reports were of a yellow, oily liquid that was dubbed "yellow rain". Those exposed claimed neurological and physical symptoms including seizures, blindness, and bleeding. Similar reports came from the Vietnamese invasion of Cambodia in 1978.

A 1997 textbook produced by the U.S. Army Medical Department asserted that over ten thousand people were killed in attacks using chemical weapons in Laos, Cambodia and Afghanistan. The descriptions of the attacks were diverse and included air-dropped canisters and sprays, booby traps, artillery shells, rockets and grenades that produced droplets of liquid, dust, powders, smoke or "insect-like" materials of a yellow, red, green, white or brown color.

Secretary of State Alexander Haig announced in September 1981 that:

For some time now, the international community has been alarmed by continuing reports that the Soviet Union and its allies have been using lethal chemical weapons in Laos, Kampuchea, and Afghanistan. ... We have now found physical evidence from Southeast Asia which has been analyzed and found to contain abnormally high levels of three potent mycotoxins—poisonous substances not indigenous to the region and which are highly toxic to man and animals.

The Soviet Union described these accusations as a "big lie" and said that the US government used chemical weapons during the Vietnam War and supplied them to Afghan rebels and Salvadoran troops. The American accusations prompted a United Nations investigation in Pakistan and Thailand. This involved five doctors and scientists who interviewed alleged witnesses and collected samples that were purported to come from Afghanistan and Cambodia. However, the interviews produced conflicting testimony and the analyses of the samples were inconclusive. The UN experts also examined two refugees who claimed to be suffering from the after-effects of a chemical attack, but the refugees were instead diagnosed as having fungal skin infections. The team reported that they were unable to verify that chemical weapons had been used but noted that circumstantial evidence "suggestive of the possible use of some sort of toxic chemical substance in some instances."

The US mycotoxin analyses were reported in the scientific literature in 1983 and 1984 and reported small amounts of mycotoxins called trichothecenes, ranging from the parts per million to traces in the parts per billion range. The lowest possible limit of detection in these mycotoxin analyses is in the parts per billion range. However, several inconsistencies in these reports caused a "prolonged, and at times acrimonious, debate on the validity of the analyses". A 2003 medical review notes that this debate may have been exacerbated since "Although analytical methods were in their infancy during the controversy, they were still sensitive enough to pick up low levels of environmental trichothecene contamination."

== Initial investigation ==
C. J. Mirocha at the University of Minnesota conducted a biochemical investigation, looking for the presence of trichothecene mycotoxins, including T-2 toxin, diacetoxyscirpenol (DAS), and deoxynivalenol (DON). This included chemical analyses of blood, urine, and tissue of alleged victims of chemical attacks in February 1982 in Laos and Kampuchea. "The finding of T-2, HT-2, and DAS toxins in blood, urine, and body tissues of alleged victims of chemical warfare in Southeast Asia provides compelling proof of the use of trichothecenes as nonconventional warfare agents. ... Additional significant findings lie in the trichothecenes found in the leaf samples (T-2, DON, nivalenol) and yellow powder (T-2, DAS). ... The most compelling evidence is the presence of T-2 and DAS in the yellow powder. Both toxins are infrequently found in nature and rarely occur together. In our experience, copious producers of T-2 toxin (F. tricinctum) do not produce DAS, and conversely, good producers of DAS (F. roseum 'Gibbosum') do not produce T-2."

== Explanation ==
=== Honeybee hypothesis ===
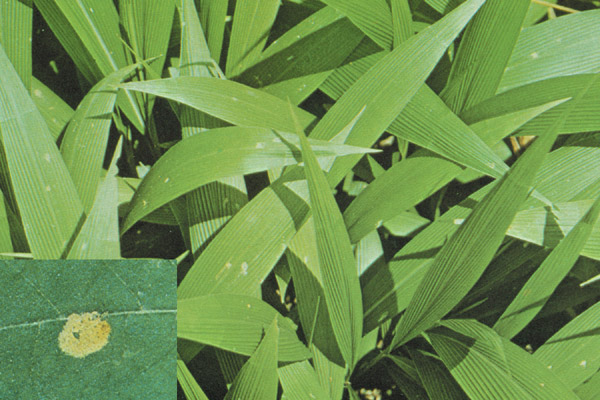
Bee droppings resembling "yellow rain"

In 1983, these charges were disputed by Harvard biologist and biological weapons opponent Matthew Meselson and his team, who traveled to Laos and conducted a separate investigation. Meselson's team noted that trichothecene mycotoxins occur naturally in the region and questioned the witness testimony. He suggested an alternate hypothesis that the yellow rain was the harmless fecal matter of honeybees. The Meselson team offered the following as evidence: separate "yellow rain drops" which occurred on the same leaf, and which were "accepted as authentic", consisted largely of pollen; each drop contained a different mix of pollen grains, as one would expect if they came from different bees, and the grains showed properties characteristic of pollen digested by bees (the protein inside the pollen grain was gone, while the outer indigestible shell remained). Further, the pollen mix came from plant species typical of the area where a drop was collected.

The US government responded to these findings by arguing that the pollen was added deliberately, in order to make a substance that could be easily inhaled and "ensure the retention of toxins in the human body". Meselson responded to this idea by stating that it was rather far-fetched to imagine that somebody would produce a chemical weapon by "gathering pollen predigested by honeybees." The fact that the pollen originated in Southeast Asia meant that the Soviet Union could not have manufactured the substance domestically, and would have had to import tons of pollen from Vietnam. Meselson's work was described in an independent medical review as providing "compelling evidence that yellow rain might have a benign natural explanation".

After the honeybee hypothesis was made public, a literature search turned up an earlier Chinese paper on the phenomenon of yellow droppings in Jiangsu Province in September 1976. Strikingly, the Chinese villagers had also used the term "yellow rain" to describe this phenomenon. Many villagers believed that the yellow droppings were portents of imminent earthquake activity. Others believed that the droppings were chemical weapons sprayed by the Soviet Union or Taiwan. However, the Chinese scientists also concluded that the droppings came from bees.

=== Mycotoxins ===
Analyses of putative "yellow rain" samples by the British, French and Swedish governments confirmed the presence of pollen and failed to find any trace of mycotoxins. Toxicology studies questioned the reliability of reports stating that mycotoxins had been detected in alleged victims up to two months after exposure, since these compounds are unstable in the body and are cleared from the blood in just a few hours. An autopsy on a Khmer Rouge fighter named Chan Mann, a victim of a putative yellow rain attack in 1982, turned up traces of mycotoxins, but also aflatoxin, Blackwater fever, and malaria.

Surveys also showed that both mycotoxin-producing fungi and mycotoxin contamination were common in Southeast Asia, casting doubt on the assertion that detecting these compounds was an unusual occurrence. For example, a Canadian military laboratory found mycotoxins in the blood of five people from the area who had never been exposed to yellow rain, out of 270 tested, but none in the blood of ten alleged victims, and a 1988 paper reported that illnesses from mycotoxin exposure may pose a serious threat to public health in Malaysia. It is now recognized that mycotoxin contamination of foods such as wheat and maize is a common problem, particularly in temperate regions of the world. As noted in a 2003 medical review, "The government research highlighted, if nothing else, that natural mycotoxicoses were an important health hazard in Southeast Asia."

=== Reliability of eyewitness accounts ===
In 1987, The New York Times reported that Freedom of Information requests showed that field investigations in 1983–85 by US government teams had produced no evidence to substantiate the initial allegations and instead cast doubt on the reliability of the initial reports, but these critical reports were not released to the public. A 1989 analysis of the initial reports gathered from Hmong refugees that was published in the Journal of the American Medical Association noted "marked inconsistencies that greatly compromised the validity of the testimony" and criticized the methods used in interviews by the US Army medical team that gathered this information. These issues included the US Army team only interviewing those people who claimed to have knowledge of attacks with chemical weapons and the investigators asking leading questions during interviews. The authors noted that individuals' stories changed over time, were inconsistent with other accounts, and that the people who claimed to have been eyewitnesses when first interviewed later stated that they had been relaying the accounts of others.

In 1982, Meselson had visited a Hmong refugee camp with samples of bee droppings that he had collected in Thailand. Most of the Hmong he interviewed claimed that these were samples of the chemical weapons that they had been attacked with. One man accurately identified them as insect droppings, but switched to the chemical weapons story after discussion with fellow Hmong.

Australian military scientist Rod Barton visited Thailand in 1984, and discovered that Thai villagers were blaming yellow rain for a variety of ailments, including scabies. An American doctor in Bangkok explained that the United States had been taking a special interest in yellow rain, and was providing medical care to alleged victims.

=== Possible U.S. origin ===
A CIA report from the 1960s reported allegations by the Cambodian government that their forces had been attacked with chemical weapons, leaving behind a yellow powder. The Cambodians blamed the United States for these alleged chemical attacks. Some of the samples of "yellow rain" collected from Cambodia in 1983 tested positive for CS, which the United States had used during the Vietnam War. CS is a form of tear gas and is not acutely toxic, but may account for some of the milder symptoms reported by the Hmong villagers.

== Scientific conclusions and US claims ==
Most of the scientific community sees these allegations as supported by insufficient evidence, or as having been completely refuted. For instance, a 1992 review published in Politics and the Life Sciences described the idea of yellow rain as a biological agent as conclusively disproved and called for an assessment by the US government of the mistakes made in this episode, stating that "the present approach of sweeping the matter under the rug and hoping people will forget about it could be counterproductive." Similarly, a 1997 review of the history of biological warfare published in the Journal of the American Medical Association stated that the yellow rain allegations are "widely regarded as erroneous", a 2001 review in the Annual Reviews in Microbiology described them as "unsubstantiated for many reasons", and a 2003 article in Annual Review of Phytopathology described them as "largely discredited". A 2003 review of the history of biological warfare described these allegations as one of many cases where states have produced propaganda containing false or unsubstantiated accusations of the use of biological weapons by their enemies.

In contrast, as of 1997 the U.S. Army maintains that some experts believe that "trichothecenes were used as biological weapons in Southeast Asia and Afghanistan" although they write that "it has not been possible for the United States to prove unequivocally that trichothecene mycotoxins were used as biological weapons." They argued that presence of pollen in yellow rain samples is best explained by the idea that "during biological warfare attacks, dispersed trichothecenes landed in pollen-containing areas." (Essentially the same position is taken in a subsequent volume in the same series of U.S. Army textbooks published in 2007.) Similarly, the US Defense Threat Reduction Agency argues that the controversy has not been resolved and states that a CIA report indicated the Soviet Union did possess weapons based on T-2 mycotoxin, although the agency states that "no trace of a trichothecene-containing weapon was ever found in the areas affected by yellow rain" and concludes that the use of such weapons "may never be unequivocally proved." A 2007 review published in Politics and the Life Sciences concluded that the balance of evidence strongly supported the hypothesis that some type of chemical or biological weapon was used in Southeast Asia in the late 1970s and early 1980s, but noted that they found no definitive proof of this hypothesis and that the evidence could not "identify the specific agents used, the intent, or the root source or sources of the attacks." The Vietnamese and the Soviets have also reportedly used other chemical weapons in conflict, in Cambodia and Afghanistan, respectively.

== Later events ==
=== India ===
An episode of mass pollen release from bees in 2002 in Sangrampur, India, prompted unfounded fears of a chemical weapons attack, although this was in fact due to a mass migration of giant Asian honeybees. This event revived memories of what New Scientist described as "cold war paranoia", and the article noted that The Wall Street Journal had covered these 1980s yellow rain allegations in particular detail. Indeed, the Wall Street Journal continues to assert that the Soviet Union used yellow rain as a chemical weapon in the 1980s and in 2003 accused Matthew Meselson of "excusing away evidence of Soviet violations."

=== Iraq ===
In the build-up to the 2003 invasion of Iraq the Wall Street Journal alleged that Saddam Hussein possessed a chemical weapon called "yellow rain". The Iraqis appear to have investigated trichothecene mycotoxins in 1990, but only purified a total of 20 ml of the agent from fungal cultures and did not manage to scale up the purification or produce any weapons containing these compounds. Although these toxins are not generally regarded as practical tactical weapons, the T-2 toxin might be a usable weapon since it can be absorbed through the skin, although it would be very difficult to manufacture it in any reasonable quantity.

Henry Wilde, a retired US Foreign Service Officer, has drawn parallels between the use of yellow rain allegations by the US government against the Soviet Union and the later exaggerated allegations on the topic of Iraq and weapons of mass destruction. Wilde considers it likely that states may again "use rumors and false or planted intelligence of such weapons use for propaganda purposes." and calls for the establishment of a more rigorous inspection process to deal with such claims. Similar concerns were expressed in a 2006 review published by the World Organisation for Animal Health, which compared the American yellow rain accusations to other Cold War-era accusations from the Soviet Union and Cuba, as well as to more recent mistaken intelligence on Iraqi weapons capabilities, concluding that such unjustified accusations have encouraged the development of biological weapons and increased the risk that they might be used, as they have discredited arms-control efforts.

=== Radiolab interview ===
In 2012 the science-themed show Radiolab aired an interview with Hmong refugee Eng Yang and his niece, author Kao Kalia Yang, to discuss Eng Yang's experience with yellow rain. The hosts took the position that yellow rain was unlikely to have been a chemical agent. The episode prompted a backlash among some listeners, who criticized Robert Krulwich for insensitivity, racism, and their disregard for Yang's personal and professional experience with the region in question. The negative response prompted host Krulwich to issue an apology for his handling of the interview.

=== Bulgaria ===
On 23 May 2015, just before the national holiday of 24 May (the day of Bulgarian writing and culture), yellow rain fell in Sofia, Bulgaria. Suspicions were raised because the Bulgarian government was criticizing Russian actions in Ukraine at the time. The Bulgarian national academy BAN explained the event as flower pollen.

=== Mai Der Vang's Yellow Rain ===
American Hmong poet Mai Der Vang published Yellow Rain (Graywolf Press, 2021) to critical acclaim and was a 2022 Finalist for the Pulitzer Prize in Poetry. The book explores yellow rain in Southeast Asia through the use of documentary poetics.

== See also ==
- Atrocity propaganda
- Agent Orange
- Red rain in Kerala
- Sverdlovsk anthrax leak
- Aral smallpox incident
- Allegations of biological warfare in the Korean War
