= Diacetoxyscirpenol =

Names
- IUPAC name 3α-Hydroxy-12α,13-epoxy-trichothec-9-ene-4β,15-diyl diacetate
- Systematic IUPAC name (2R,2′R,3R,4S,5S,5aR,9aR)-5a-[(Acetyloxy)methyl]-3-hydroxy-5,8-dimethyl-2,3,4,5,5a,6,7,9a-octahydrospiro[[2,5]methano[1]benzoxepine-10,2′-oxiran]-4-yl acetate
- Other names anguidine

Identifiers
CAS Number	2270-40-8
3D model (JSmol)	Interactive image
ChemSpider	82639
ECHA InfoCard	100.017.159
PubChem CID	91518
UNII	UYL28I099N
CompTox Dashboard (EPA)	DTXSID80891791
- InChI: InChI=1S/C19H26O7/c1-10-5-6-18(8-23-11(2)20)13(7-10)26-16-14(22)15(25-12(3)21)17(18,4)19(16)9-24-19/h7,13-16,22H,5-6,8-9H2,1-4H3/t13-,14-,15-,16-,17-,18-,19-/m1/s1 Key: AUGQEEXBDZWUJY-ZLJUKNTDSA-N
- SMILES: CC1=C[C@@H]2[C@](CC1)([C@]3([C@@H]([C@H]([C@H]([C@]34CO4)O2)O)OC(=O)C)C)COC(=O)C

Properties
Chemical formula	C_{19}H_{26}O_{7}
Molar mass	366.410 g·mol^{−1}
- Except where otherwise noted, data are given for materials in their standard state (at 25 °C [77 °F], 100 kPa). Infobox references

Diacetoxyscirpenol (DAS), also called anguidine, is a mycotoxin from the group of type A trichothecenes. It is a secondary metabolite product of fungi of the genus Fusarium and may cause toxicosis in farm animals. The US Health and Human Services agency considers it a select agent for research purposes.
