= Synthesis of nanoparticles by fungi =

Throughout human history, fungi have been utilized as a source of food and harnessed to ferment and preserve foods and beverages. In the 20th century, humans have learned to harness fungi to protect human health (antibiotics, anti-cholesterol statins, and immunosuppressive agents), while industry has utilized fungi for large scale production of enzymes, acids, and biosurfactants. With the advent of modern nanotechnology in the 1980s, fungi have remained important by providing a greener alternative to chemically synthesized nanoparticle.

== Background ==
SEM image of fungal hyphae and fungal derived silver nanoparticles showing a large conglomeration made up of individual nanoparticles with fungal hyphae (dark areas) in background.

A nanoparticle is defined as having one dimension 100 nm or less in size. Environmentally toxic or biologically hazardous reducing agents are typically involved in the chemical synthesis of nanoparticles so there has been a search for greener production alternatives. Current research has shown that microorganisms, plant extracts, and fungi can produce nanoparticles through biological pathways. The most common nanoparticles synthesized by fungi are silver and gold, however fungi have been utilized in the synthesis other types of nanoparticles including zinc oxide, platinum, magnetite, zirconia, silica, titanium, and cadmium sulfide and cadmium selenide quantum dots.

== Silver nanoparticle production ==
Synthesis of silver nanoparticles has been investigated utilizing many ubiquitous fungal species including Trichoderma, Fusarium, Penicillium, Rhizoctonia, Pleurotus and Aspergillus. Extracellular synthesis has been demonstrated by Trichoderma virde, T. reesei, Fusarium oxysporm, F. semitectum, F. solani, Aspergillus niger, A. flavus, A. fumigatus, A. clavatus, Pleurotus ostreatus, Cladosporium cladosporioides, Penicillium brevicompactum, P. fellutanum, an endophytic Rhizoctonia sp., Epicoccum nigrum, Chrysosporium tropicum, and Phoma glomerata, while intracellular synthesis was shown to occur in a Verticillium species, and in Neurospora crassa.

== Gold nanoparticle production ==
Synthesis of gold nanoparticles has been investigated utilizing Fusarium, Neurospora, Verticillium, yeasts, and Aspergillus. Extracellular gold nanoparticle synthesis was demonstrated by Fusarium oxysporum, Aspergillus niger, and cytosolic extracts from Candida albican. Intracellular gold nanoparticle synthesis has been demonstrated by a Verticillum species, V. luteoalbum,

== Miscellaneous nanoparticle production ==
In addition to gold and silver, Fusarium oxysporum has been used to synthesize zirconia, titanium, cadmium sulfide and cadmium selenide nanosize particles. Cadmium sulfide nanoparticles have also been synthesized by Trametes versicolor, Schizosaccharomyces pombe, and Candida glabrata. The white-rot fungus Phanerochaete chrysosporium has also been demonstrated to be able to synthesize elemental selenium nanoparticles.

== Culture techniques and conditions ==
Culture techniques and media vary depending upon the requirements of the fungal isolate involved, however the general procedure consist of the following: fungal hyphae are typically placed in liquid growth media and placed in shake culture until the fungal culture has increased in biomass. The fungal hyphae are removed from the growth media, washed with distilled water to remove the growth media, placed in distilled water and incubated on shake culture for 24 to 48 hours. The fungal hyphae are separated from the supernatant, and an aliquot of the supernatant is added to 1.0 mM ion solution. The ion solution is then monitored for 2 to 3 days for the formation of nanoparticles. Another common culture technique is to add washed fungal hyphae directly into 1.0 mM ion solution instead of utilizing the fungal filtrate. Silver nitrate is the most widely used source of silver ions, but silver sulfate has also been utilized. Choloroauric acid is generally used as the source of gold ions at various concentrations (1.0 mM and 250 mg to 500 mg of Au per liter). Cadmium sulfide nanoparticle synthesis for F. oxysporum was conducted using a 1:1 ratio of Cd^{2+} and SO_{4}^{2−} at a 1 mM concentration. Gold nanoparticles can vary in shape and size depending on the pH of the ion solution. Gericke and Pinches (2006) reported that for V. luteoalbum small (cc.10 nm) spherical gold nanoparticles are formed at pH 3, larger (spherical, triangular, hexagon and rods) gold nanoparticles are formed at pH 5, and at pH 7 to pH 9 the large nanoparticles tend to lack a defined shape. Temperature interactions for both silver and gold nanoparticles were similar; a lower temperature resulted in larger nanoparticles while higher temperatures produced smaller nanoparticles.

== Analytical techniques ==
=== Visual observations ===
For externally synthesized silver nanoparticles the silver ion solution generally becomes brownish in color, but this browning reaction may be absent. For fungi that synthesize intracellular silver nanoparticles, the hyphae darken to a brownish color while the solution remains clear. In both cases the browning reaction is attributed to the surface plasmon resonance of the metallic nanoparticles. For external gold nanoparticle production, the solution color can vary depending on the size of the gold nanoparticles; smaller particles appear pink while large particles appear purple. Intracellular gold nanoparticle synthesis typically turns the hyphae purple while the solution remains clear. Externally synthesized cadmium sulfide nanoparticles were reported to make the solution color appear bright yellow.

=== Analytical tools ===
Scanning electron microscopy (SEM), transmission electron microscopy (TEM), energy dispersive analysis of X-ray (EDX), UV-vis spectroscopy, and X-ray diffraction are used to characterize different aspects of nanoparticles. Both SEM and TEM can be used to visualize the location, size, and morphology of the nanoparticles, while UV-vis spectroscopy can be used to confirm the metallic nature, size and aggregation level. Energy dispersive analysis of X-ray is used to determine elemental composition, and X-ray diffraction is used to determine chemical composition and crystallographic structure. UV-Vis absorption peaks for silver, gold, and cadmium sulfide nanoparticles can vary depending on particle size: 25-50 nm silver particles peak ca. 415 nm, gold nanoparticles 30-40 nm peak ca. 450 nm, while a cadmium sulfide absorption edge ca. 450 is indicative of quantum size particles. Larger nanoparticle of each type will have UV-Vis absorption peaks or edges that shift to longer wavelengths while smaller nanoparticles will have UV-Vis absorption peaks or edges that shift to shorter wavelengths.

== Formation mechanisms ==
=== Gold and silver ===
SEM image of fungal derived silver nanoparticles stabilized by a capping agent.

Nitrate reductase was suggested to initiate nanoparticle formation by many fungi including Penicillium species, while several enzymes, α-NADPH-dependent reductases, nitrate-dependent reductases and an extracellular shuttle quinone, were implicated in silver nanoparticle synthesis for Fusarium oxysporum. Jain et al. (2011) indicated that silver nanoparticle synthesis for A. flavus occurs initially by a "33kDa" protein followed by a protein (cystein and free amine groups) electrostatic attraction which stabilizes the nanoparticle by forming a capping agent. Intracellular silver and gold nanoparticle synthesis is not fully understood but similar fungal cell wall surface electrostatic attraction, reduction, and accumulation has been proposed. External gold nanoparticle synthesis by P. chrysosporium was attributed to laccase, while intracellular gold nanoparticle synthesis was attributed to ligninase.

=== Cadmium sulfide ===
Cadmium sulfide nanoparticle synthesis by yeast involves sequestration of Cd^{2+} by glutathione-related peptides followed by reduction within the cell. Ahmad et al. (2002) reported that cadmium sulfide nanoparticle synthesis by Fusarium oxysporum was based on a sulfate reductase (enzyme) process.
