= Alimentary toxic aleukia =

- Other names: Aleukia, ATA
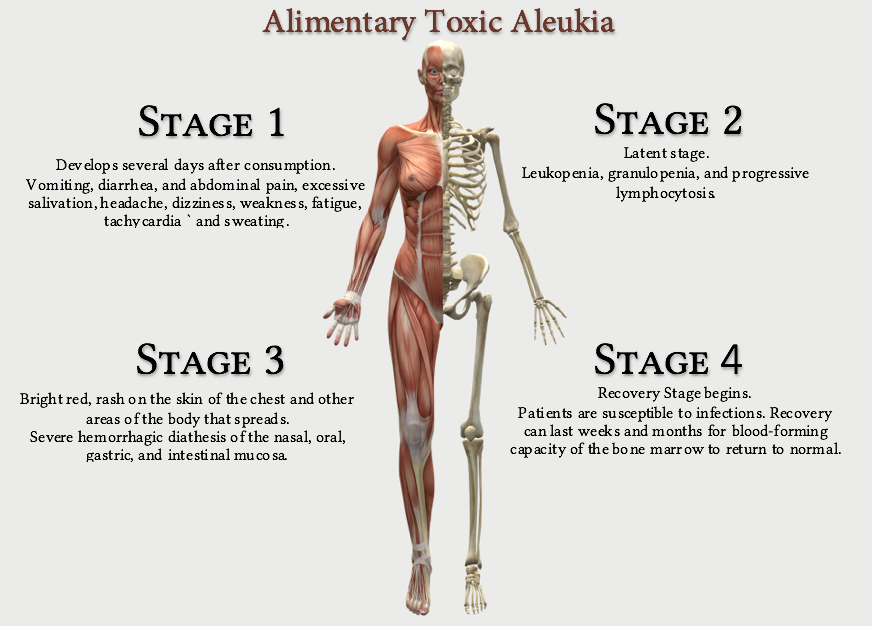
- Stages of Alimentary Toxic Aleukia
- Symptoms: Nausea, vomiting, diarrhea, leukopenia (aleukia), hemorrhaging, skin inflammation.
- Causes: Intake of fungi-infested overwintered grain or grain by-products.
- Treatment: Excluding various wintered grain products and flour from the diet.

Alimentary toxic aleukia is a mycotoxin-induced condition characterized by nausea, vomiting, diarrhea, leukopenia (aleukia), hemorrhaging, skin inflammation, and sometimes death. Alimentary toxic aleukia almost always refers to the human condition associated with presence of T-2 Toxin.

== Signs and symptoms ==
Alimentary toxic aleukia manifests in inflammation of the gastric and intestinal mucosa, a severe progressive leukopenia, anemia, and an increased erythrocyte sedimentation rate. Subsequently petechial hemorrhages of both the skin and mucosa as well as enlarged lymph nodes are seen. Symptoms of the respiratory system include bronchopneumonia, pulmonary hemorrhages, sepsis, and lung abscesses. Vomiting, bloody stools, lassitude, and incoordination are also observed. The severity of the disease and its course was determined by the quantity of the toxin and the various reactive properties of various tissues and organs to the toxin.

There are four stages of ATA. The first stage is acute intoxication. The leukopenia stage is the next. The third stage is distinguished by distinct clinical symptoms (anginal-hemorrhagic stage), and the fourth by recovery and possible complications.

=== Stage One ===
Local and systemic symptoms can appear immediately or several hours after consuming a meal prepared with the toxic wintered grain. Local symptoms include a bitter taste in the mouth, which leads to a complete loss of taste, tongue numbness or swelling, a burning sensation in the mouth, and pain when swallowing. If no more hazardous grain was consumed, the foregoing symptoms subsided within 2 or 3 days, but they resurfaced as soon as the patient resumed consumption of this grain. Toxemia manifested as weakness, malaise, rheumatic-like pain, hyperhidrosis, a condition similar to alcohol intoxication, and insomnia. These symptoms typically go away in 3 to 5 days.

There were isolated cases of acute food poisoning resulting in acute esophagitis, gastritis, or gastroenteritis, with hypersalivation, nausea, vomiting, esophageal and stomach pain, diarrhea, and fevers of up to 39 degrees. Giddiness, headache, mydriasis, tachycardia, cyanosis, limb coldness, and convulsions were also reported. There were also hemorrhagic diathesis with cutaneous and mucosal hemorrhages and epistaxis. In such circumstances, the blood count can indicate hematopoiesis alterations as quickly as 1-4 days; this was followed by neutropenia and relative lymphocytosis, thrombocytopenia, and some erythrocyte sedimentation rate acceleration.

=== Stage Two ===
With the subsequent ingesting of the toxic grain, the disease advances and enters the second stage within a few days. Because there is no habituation to the harmful substance, local symptoms may reoccur. The duration of the ATA leukopenia stage could vary from 2-3 weeks to 6-8 weeks and even 3-4 months. Clinically, the leukopenia stage manifests as symptoms of the central and vegetative nervous systems. Patients reported fatigue, apathy, vertigo, headache, and poor sleep. The patients' skin would appear pale, and dry, and the symptoms of late dermographism mydriasis would be clearly visible. The patients showed a petechial rash towards the end of the leukopenia stage. The petechial patches were initially quite little, but as the disease advanced, they grew in size. When the leukopenia stage was treated promptly and adequately, it was often followed by recovery.

=== Stage Three ===
Acute symptoms such as rash, hemorrhages, necrotic angina tonsillaris, high temperature, and tachycardia mark the third ATA stage. The leukocyte count continues to fall. Bleeding time increases, and the coagulability of the blood is delayed. Hemorrhages occur in the nose, pharynx, esophagus, gut, kidney, bladder, and uterus. Hemorrhages can be severe and difficult to control, resulting in significant blood loss and even death. Patients develop angina several days following the formation of the petechial rash, which in severe cases might be necrotic or gangrenous. The tonsils completely decomposed, followed by acute edema of the laryngeal vestibule and blockage within 3-8 days with necrotic masses and blood clots. Asphyxia and aphonia ensued, and many people died as a result. The gangrenous process progressed to the soft palate, gums, tongue, lips, cheeks, and nasal cavity, resulting in tooth loss and cheek perforation. These symptoms were particularly prevalent in individuals who had an imbalanced diet and in children. Severe oropharyngeal symptoms were followed by an increase in hemorrhagic diathesis. Acute hepatitis typically manifests itself during the third ATA stage. The liver would become slightly enlarged, while the spleen would remain normal. There was microhematuria and, on rare occasions, hematuria. Even in the most severe cases, significant improvements and even recovery within 1-2 weeks was feasible. Heart paralysis, uncontrollable hemorrhages, suffocation, pneumonia with pulmonary abscesses, and gangrene all contributed to death.

=== Stage Four ===
When pathogenetic therapy was administered, the condition advanced to the fourth stage, which lasted 10-14 days. The necrotic fool began to mend and hemorrhages stopped during this pealed; a reduction of fever showed recovery from acute toxemia. However, lingering toxic symptoms (tachycardia, hypotension, apical systolic murmur, left heart dilatation, dyspnea, weakness, vertigo, gastritis, gastroenteritis, hepatitis, central and vegetative nervous system problems) persisted for an extended period of time.

== Treatment ==
At the early stages of the condition, therapeutic measures include excluding various wintered grain products and flour from the diet and monitoring erythrocyte, platelet, and leukocyte differential counts. In the second stage, therapeutic interventions include balanced nutrition, which includes biologically beneficial proteins and Vitamins such as ascorbic acid, thiamine, riboflavin, niacin, vitamin B, folacin, and vitamin E.

When the condition reaches the third stage, the patient is immediately hospitalized and placed on a balanced diet. Early prescription or large doses of sulfamide compounds and adequate antibiotics were required, as well as the use of general and hemopoiesis-stimulated blood transfusion and autohemotherapy, the administration of hemostatic, detoxicating, and cardiovascular activity-stimulating agents, and the local treatment of necrotic foci.

In the fourth stage, medical treatments would be focused on increasing the body's response capacity through general bracing and hemopoiesis stimulation, as well as eradicating toxic residual effects with detoxication medications.

== History ==
Alimentary toxic aleukia was first characterized in the early 20th century after affecting a large population in the Orenburg Oblast of the former USSR in 1933 and during World War II. The sick people had eaten overwintered grain colonized with Fusarium sporotrichioides and Fusarium poae.
