= Fusarium ear blight =

Fungal disease of cereals

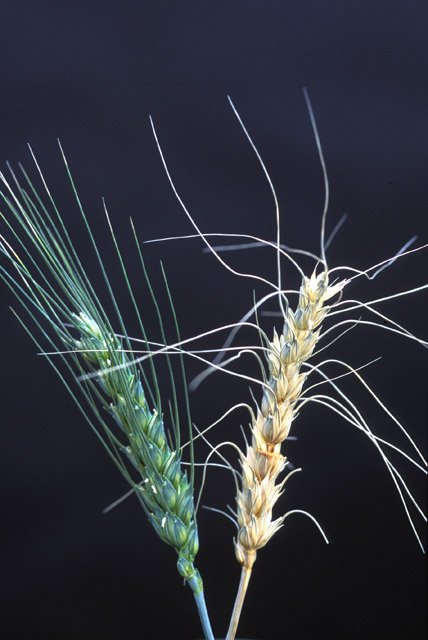
Symptom on wheat caused by F. graminearum (right: inoculated, left: non-inoculated)

Fusarium ear blight (FEB) (also called Fusarium head blight, FHB, or scab), is a fungal disease of cereals, including wheat, barley, oats, rye and triticale. FEB is caused by a range of Fusarium fungi, which infects the heads of the crop, reducing grain yield. The disease is often associated with contamination by mycotoxins produced by the fungi already when the crop is growing in the field. The disease can cause severe economic losses as mycotoxin-contaminated grain cannot be sold for food or feed.

== Causal organism ==
Fusarium ear blight is caused by several species of Fusarium fungi, belonging to the Ascomycota. The most common species causing FEB are:

- Fusarium avenaceum (teleomorph: Gibberella avenacea)
- Fusarium culmorum
- Fusarium graminearum (teleomorph: Gibberella zeae)
- Fusarium poae
- Microdochium nivale (teleomorph: Monographella nivalis, formerly Fusarium nivale)
- Fusarium tricinctum

Fusarium graminearum was considered the most important causal organism.

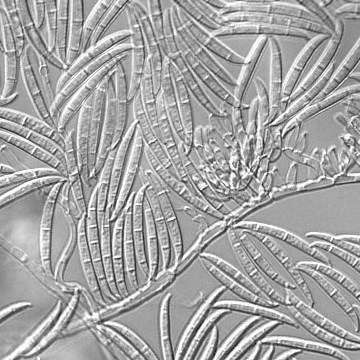
Macroconidia of F. graminearum

Fusarium species causing FEB can produce several types of spores. The asexual stage of the fungus produces spores called macroconidia. Some Fusarium fungi have a more complex life cycle including a sexual stage, for example F. graminearum. In the sexual stage the fungus produces spores called ascospores. The sexual stage form fruiting bodies called perithecia, in which ascospores are formed in a sac known as an ascus (plural asci). Some species, including F. culmorum, produce resistant chlamydospores which can survive for a long time in the soil.

== Disease cycle and epidemiology ==
Fusarium fungi can overwinter as saprotrophs in the soil or on crop debris that can serve as inoculum for the following crop. The fungus can also spread via infected seed. The presence of Fusarium fungi on crop debris or seed can cause Fusarium seedling blight and foot and root rot. Later, infection of the heads can occur with spores spreading by rain splash from infected crop residues. Another major infection route is airborne inoculum as spores can travel long distances with the wind. The cereal crop is most susceptible at flowering and the probability of infection rises with high moisture and humidity at flowering.

== Symptoms ==
In wheat, Fusarium infects the head (hence the name "Fusarium head blight") and causes the kernels to shrivel up and become chalky white. Additionally, the fungus can produce mycotoxins that further reduce the quality of the kernel.

Infected florets (especially the outer glumes) become slightly darkened and oily in appearance. Macroconidia are produced in sporodochia, which gives the spike a bright pink or orange color. Infected kernels may be permeated with mycelia and the surface of the florets totally covered by white, matted mycelia.

== Mycotoxins ==
Fusarium species associated with FEB produce a range of mycotoxins—fungal secondary metabolites with toxic effects on animals. One mycotoxin can be produced by several Fusarium species, and one species can produce several mycotoxins. Important Fusarium mycotoxins include:

- Deoxynivalenol (DON) produced by F. graminearum and F. culmorum
- Zearalenone (ZEN) produced by F. graminearum and F. culmorum
- HT-2 and T-2 produced by F. langsethiae

Fusarium toxins have negative effects on the immune, gastrointestinal and reproductive systems of animals. DON is a protein synthesis inhibitor, also called vomitoxin, due to its negative effects on feed intake in pigs. Pigs are the most sensitive to DON, while ruminant animals such as cattle have higher tolerance.

Many countries monitor Fusarium mycotoxins in grain to limit negative health effects. In the U.S. there are advisory levels for DON in human food and livestock feed. The European Union has legislative limits for several Fusarium mycotoxins in grain aimed for human consumption ^{repealed by} and recommended limits for animal feed.

== Control measures ==
=== Resistant cultivars ===
Resistant cultivars could be the most efficient method to control Fusarium ear blight. Resistance breeding involves screening of plant lines subjected to artificial inoculation with Fusarium. Plant lines having reduced fungal growth and low levels of seed mycotoxin contamination are selected for additional breeding trials. In parallel, genetic markers associated with resistance are screened for, so called marker-assisted selection. Fusarium ear blight resistance is a complex trait, involving several genes, and is dependent of interaction with the environment.

Fusarium ear blight resistance has been identified in wheat cultivars from Asia. However, the challenge is to combine resistant material with other desirable traits such as high yield and adaptation to different growing areas.

=== Agricultural practices ===
Several agricultural practices affect the risk of FEB. One of the major infection routes are infected crop residues from the previous crop where both the quality and quantity are important. Crop residues from susceptible crops such as cereals increase the risk of FEB in the following crop. Maize has been associated with especially high risk. Reduced soil tillage can also increase the risk of FEB. The amount of crop residues can be reduced by ploughing, where residues are incorporated in the soil where they decompose faster. High nitrogen application has also been associated with increased risk of Fusarium infection. Preventive agricultural practices may be less effective if a lot of airborne inoculum is present in the area.

=== Chemical control ===
Fungicides can provide partial control of FEB but the effects may be variable. The type and timing of fungicide application is important as non-optimal applications may even increase Fusarium infection.

=== Biological control and integrated management ===
Research has also been put into development on biological control strategies based on bacteria and fungi for example, Bacillus and Cryptococcus species.

For FEB no control measure is completely effective and integrated management involving several control strategies such as preventive measures, disease monitoring and chemical control is necessary. Disease forecasting models have been developed to assess the risk of FEB depending on weather conditions.

== Economic importance ==
From an economic standpoint, it is one of the major cereal diseases, being responsible for significant grain yield reduction world-wide.

In the U.S. and Canada, Fusarium ear blight emerged in the 1990s as a widespread and powerful threat to cereal production. From 1998 to 2000 the Midwestern United States suffered $2.7 billion in losses following a FEB epidemic. If we include primary and secondary economic losses, FHB cost the entire US$7.67 billion from 1993 to 2001. Since 1990, extensive research has been put into the development of control measures of Fusarium ear blight. An example is the US Wheat and Barley Scab Initiative (USWBSI), a collaborative effort of scientists, growers, food processors and consumer groups aiming to develop effective control measures, including the reduction of mycotoxins.

== See also ==
- Plant disease epidemiology
- Plant pathology
