= T-2 mycotoxin =

T-2
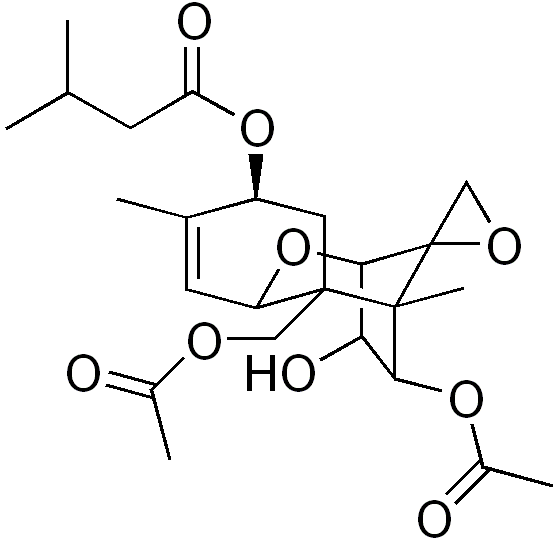

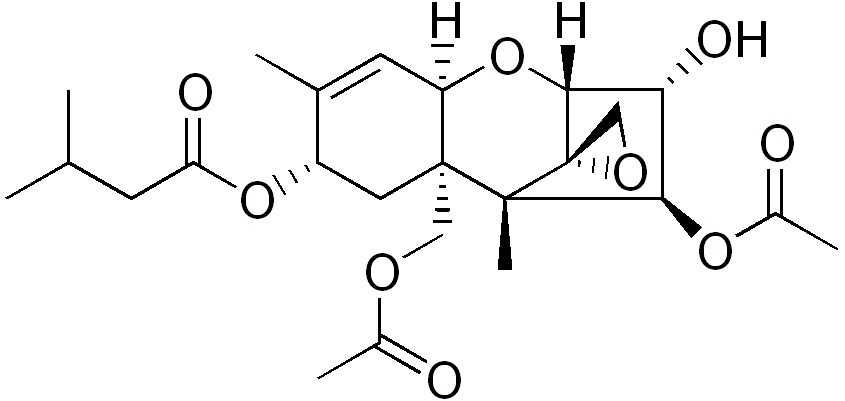

Names
- IUPAC name (2α,3α,4β,8α)-4,15-bis(acetyloxy)-3-hydroxy-12,13-epoxytrichothec-9-en-8-yl 3-methylbutanoate
- Other names T-2 Toxin; Fusariotoxin T 2 Insariotoxin; Mycotoxin T 2

Identifiers
CAS Number	21259-20-1
3D model (JSmol)	Interactive image
ChEBI	CHEBI:9381
ChEMBL	ChEMBL152423
ChemSpider	4447526
ECHA InfoCard	100.040.255
PubChem CID	5284461
RTECS number	YD0100000
UNII	I3FL5NM3MO
CompTox Dashboard (EPA)	DTXSID6021298
- InChI: InChI=1S/C24H34O9/c1-12(2)7-18(27)32-16-9-23(10-29-14(4)25)17(8-13(16)3)33-21-19(28)20(31-15(5)26)22(23,6)24(21)11-30-24/h8,12,16-17,19-21,28H,7,9-11H2,1-6H3/t16-,17+,19+,20+,21+,22+,23+,24-/m0/s1 Key: BXFOFFBJRFZBQZ-QYWOHJEZSA-N; InChI=1/C24H34O9/c1-12(2)7-18(27)32-16-9-23(10-29-14(4)25)17(8-13(16)3)33-21-19(28)20(31-15(5)26)22(23,6)24(21)11-30-24/h8,12,16-17,19-21,28H,7,9-11H2,1-6H3/t16-,17+,19+,20+,21+,22+,23+,24-/m0/s1 Key: BXFOFFBJRFZBQZ-QYWOHJEZBH
- SMILES: O=C(O[C@@H]4C(=C/[C@H]3O[C@H]2[C@]1(OC1)[C@]([C@H](OC(=O)C)[C@H]2O)([C@@]3(COC(=O)C)C4)C)\C)CC(C)C

Properties
Chemical formula	C_{24}H_{34}O_{9}
Molar mass	466.527 g·mol^{−1}
Solubility in water	Insoluble
- Except where otherwise noted, data are given for materials in their standard state (at 25 °C [77 °F], 100 kPa). verify (what is ?) Infobox references

T-2 mycotoxin is a trichothecene mycotoxin. It is a naturally occurring mold byproduct of Fusarium spp. fungus which is toxic to humans and other animals. The clinical condition it causes is alimentary toxic aleukia and a host of symptoms related to organs as diverse as the skin, airway, and stomach. Ingestion may come from consumption of moldy whole grains. T-2 can be absorbed through human skin. Although no significant systemic effects are expected after dermal contact in normal agricultural or residential environments, local skin effects can not be excluded. Hence, skin contact with T-2 should be avoided.

== History ==
Alimentary toxic aleukia (ATA), a disease which is caused by trichothecenes like T-2 mycotoxin, killed many thousands of USSR citizens in the Orenburg District in the 1940s. It was reported that the mortality rate was 10% of the entire population in that area. During the 1970s it was proposed that the consumption of contaminated food was the cause of this mass poisoning. Because of World War II, harvesting of grains was delayed and food was scarce in Russia. This resulted in the consumption of grain that was contaminated with Fusarium molds, which produce T-2 mycotoxin.

In 1981, the United States Secretary of State Alexander Haig and his successor George P. Shultz accused the Soviet Union of using T-2 mycotoxin as a chemical weapon known as "yellow rain" in Laos (1975–81), Kampuchea (1979–81), and Afghanistan (1979–81), where it allegedly caused thousands of casualties. Although several US chemical weapons experts claim to have identified "yellow rain" samples from Laos as trichothecenes, other experts believe that this exposure was due to naturally occurring T-2 mycotoxin in contaminated foods. Another alternative theory was developed by Harvard biologist Matthew Meselson, who proposed that the "yellow rain" found in Southeast Asia originated from the excrement of jungle bees. The first indication for this theory came from finding high levels of pollen in the collected samples, giving the substance its yellow color. It was also found that jungle bees in this area fly collectively in great numbers, at altitudes too high to be easily seen, producing showers of feces that could have been mistaken for sprays from aircraft. Further testing later determined that the oily liquid was, in fact, the pollen-filled feces of jungle bees. A similar case in China was brought to light, and in this instance the cause of the phenomenon had also been bee excrement. Despite this conclusive analysis, the United States has not withdrawn its allegations and declares that the issue has not been fully resolved.

T-2 mycotoxin is also thought to be a cause of Gulf War syndrome. US troops suffered from mycotoxicosis-like symptoms after an Iraqi missile detonated in a US military camp in Saudi Arabia during Operation Desert Storm in the Persian Gulf War, in 1991. It has been shown that Iraq researched trichothecene mycotoxins, among other substances, and thus was capable of its possession and employment in chemical warfare. Nevertheless, much of the key information from these incidents remains classified, leaving these matters still unresolved.

== Chemical properties ==
This compound has a tetracyclic sesquiterpenoid 12,13-epoxytrichothene ring system, which relates it to the trichothecenes. These compounds are generally very stable and are not degraded during storage/milling and cooking/processing of food. They do not degrade at high temperatures either. This compound has an epoxide ring, and several acetyl and hydroxyl groups on its side chains. These features are mainly responsible for the biological activity of the compound and make it highly toxic. T-2 mycotoxin is able to inhibit DNA and RNA synthesis in vivo and in vitro and can induce apoptosis. However, in vivo the compound rapidly metabolizes to HT-2 mycotoxin (a major metabolite).

== Mechanism of action ==
The toxicity of T-2 toxin is due to its 12,13-epoxy ring. Epoxides are in general toxic compounds; these react with nucleophiles and then undergo further enzymatic reactions. The reactivity of epoxides can lead to reactions with endogenous compounds and cellular constituents like DNA bases and proteins. These reactions could be the reason for the noticed actions and effects of T-2 mycotoxin. The toxic compound influences the metabolism of membrane phospholipids, leads to an increase of liver lipid peroxidases and has an inhibiting effect on DNA and RNA synthesis. In addition it can bind to an integral part of the 60s ribosomal subunit, peptidyltransferase, thereby inhibiting protein synthesis. These effects are thought to be the explanation for T-2 toxin inducing apoptosis (cell death) in different tissues as the immune system, the gastrointestinal tissue and also fetal tissue. With regard to apoptosis there has been noticed that the level of the pro-apoptotic factor Bas (Bcl-2-associated X protein) was increased and the level of Bcl-xl, an anti-apoptotic factor, was decreased in human chondrocytes (cartilage cells). When exposed to T-2 mycotoxin. Furthermore, the level of Fas, an apoptosis-related cell-surface antigen and p53, a protein regulating the cell cycle, were increased.

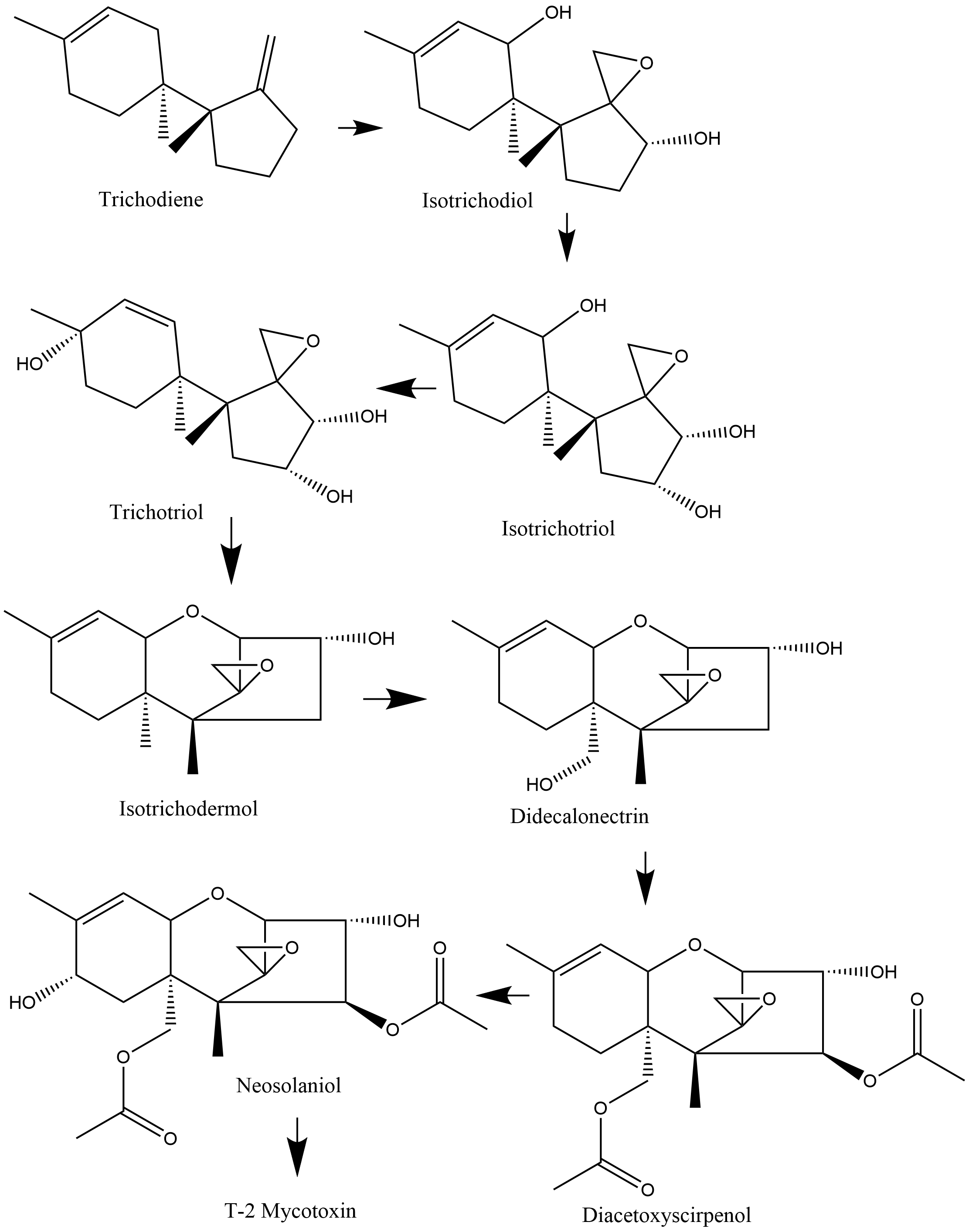
Simplified biosynthesis of the T-2 Mycotoxin in F. sporotrichioides

== Synthesis ==
T-2 mycotoxin is produced naturally by Fusarium fungi of which the most important species are: F. sporotrichioides, F. langsethiae, F. acuminatum and F. poae. These fungi are found in grains such as barley, wheat and oats. The production of this compound for research and commercial purposes is generally accomplished by cultivating some strain of T-2 mycotoxin producing fungi on agar plates. On these agar plates the fungi appear powdery and can yield substantial amounts of T-2 mycotoxin. For the isolation of the compound high pressure liquid chromatography is commonly used (HPLC).

In the Fusarium species, biosynthesis of the T-2 mycotoxin often starts with trichodiene, and many of the species share a common route of oxidizations and cyclizations. As an example, from the F. sporotrichioides species, the important oxidation steps that occur start from trichodiene and goes to isotrichodiol. From there, the eleventh carbon atom is oxidized to form isotrichotriol. The ninth carbon is then oxidized, and trichotriol is formed, which then cyclizes to make isotrichodermol. After that, the fifteenth carbon is oxidized to form didecalonectrin, which leads to the fourth carbon being oxidized, and diacetoxyscirpenol is formed. The second to last step is the oxidation of the eighth carbon to make neosolaniol, which then undergoes slight modification to create the T-2 toxin.

== Toxicity ==
=== ADME properties ===
==== Absorption and exposure ====
Humans and animals are generally exposed to T-2 mycotoxins through food. Certain grains can contain the toxin which makes it a threat to human health and an economic burden. Unlike most biological toxins T-2 mycotoxin can be absorbed through intact skin. The compound can be delivered via food, water, droplets, aerosols and smoke from various dispersal systems. This makes it a potential biological weapon, however large amounts of the compound are required for a lethal dose. T-2 mycotoxin has an LD_{50} of approximately 1 milligram per kilogram of body weight.

The EFSA estimates that the mean exposure of T-2 in the EU lies between 12 and 43 ng/kg bw/day. This range is below the TDI of 100 ng/ kg body weight for the sum of HT-2 and T-2 toxins which is used by the EFSA.

==== Distribution ====
T-2 mycotoxin is distributed uniformly throughout the body without preference to a specific organ or site. In rodents, plasma concentration levels peak around roughly thirty minutes after exposure, and in one study, the half-life of the T-2 toxin was seen to be less than twenty minutes. In a different study involving pigs, the distribution after four hours of IV injection was seen to be 15–24% in the GI tract and 4.7–5.2% in various other tissues.

==== Metabolism ====
Once absorbed and distributed to various tissues, the T-2 mycotoxin goes through various metabolic reactions before it gets excreted. In vivo studies showed that the most occurring reactions are ester hydrolysis and hydroxylation of the isovaleryl group. Deepoxidation and glucuronide conjugation do also occur. HT-2 is the main metabolite. For the hydroxylation, the cytochrome p450 enzyme complex is suggested to be involved. T-2 triol and T-2 tetraol are most likely to be formed via acetylcholine esterases. Some of the metabolic reactions of the mycotoxin are performed by the microflora in the gut. The formed metabolites in these reactions are species- and pH-dependent. The ester cleavages are however performed by the mammal itself and not by the microflora. In red blood cells T-2 mycotoxin is metabolized to neosolaniol, and, in white blood cells, to HT-2 via hydrolysis catalyzed by carboxylesterases.

==== Excretion ====
Following absorption, distribution, and metabolism, T-2 mycotoxin is excreted fairly quickly, where 80–90% of it is excreted within 48 hours. The main methods of excretion seem to be from the urine and feces, where excretion through bile contributes heavily to the feces route of excretion. There is also very little of the parent T-2 mycotoxin in the excretions, meaning most of the initial compound is metabolized beforehand.

=== Toxic effects ===
T-2 is highly toxic when inhaled. Acute toxic symptoms include vomiting, diarrhea, skin irritation, itching, rash, blisters, bleeding and dyspnea. If the individual is exposed to T-2 over a longer period, alimentary toxic aleukia (ATA) develops.

At first the patient experiences a burning sensation in the mouth, throat and stomach. After a few days, the person will suffer from an acute gastroenteritis that will last for 3 to 9 days. Within 9 weeks, the bone marrow will slowly degenerate. The skin starts bleeding and the total number of leukocytes decreases. Problems with the nervous system may occur.

In the end, a high fever, petechial haemorrhage, necrosis of muscles and skin, bacterial infections of the necrotic tissue, and enlarged lymph nodes might occur. There is a possibility of asphyxia because of laryngeal edema and stenosis of the glottis. The lack of oxygen is then the cause of death. Otherwise, the patient might die of bronchial pneumonia and lung bleeding.

=== Effects on animals ===
T-2 mycotoxin is also toxic to animals. The compound is known for having lethal and sub-lethal effects on farm animals. It is often found in contaminated cereal grains that are fed to these animals. Most of the toxic effects are shared between humans and animals. After exposing zebra fish embryos to a concentration of 20 μmol/L or higher malformation and mortality rates increased. The malformations included tail deformities, cardiovascular defects and changes in behavior in early stages of life. This is the result of an increase in the amount of epoxides, which causes cell apoptosis. Other studies have shown that T-2-toxin causes lipid peroxidation in rats after feeding it to them. As the effect of T-2 toxin, elevated reactive oxygen species (ROS) levels were observed in several mammalian species. However, in spite of the general harmful effects caused by the toxin, in a study carried out in different chicken derived hepatic cell culture models, no alterations were found in the redox status of the cells.

The compound also seems to reduce the fertility of ewes and heifers. Research has shown that a high dose of T-2 delays the ovulation due to a delayed follicle maturation. This possibly retards the following luteinisation, which makes it impossible for female animals to conceive.

T-2 also has an effect on the fertility of bulls. In 1998 it was discovered that moldy hay influenced the quality of semen of bulls. Analysis of the moldy hay showed that T-2 was present. The compound decreased sperm motility and testosterone levels and increased the frequency of morphological abnormalities in the sperm cells.

The liver is another target for the mycotoxin. It is one of the first organs where the compound passes through after ingestion. Here it causes a reduced expression of CYP1A proteins in rabbits, pigs and rats. CYP3A activity decreases in pigs too. These enzymes help metabolize drugs that pass through the liver. Decrease in the activity could lead to an increase of unmetabolized drugs in the plasma. This can have a dangerous effect on an animal's health.

All of the mentioned effects happen when T-2 is ingested in high doses. Animals are able to metabolize the compound with enzymes from the CYP3A family, just like humans.

== Treatments ==
At the moment, there is no specific therapy for T-2 mycotoxin poisonings. Exposure of the mycotoxin is typically followed by standardized treatment for toxic compounds in order to reduce the effect of the toxin. This includes using activated charcoal, which has a high binding capacity of 0.48 mg of T-2 mycotoxin to 1 mg of charcoal. For dermal contact, soap and water is used to reduce the dermal effects. As a kind of prophylaxis, antioxidants are believed to have properties that may provide benefits.

== Application ==
There are currently no applications, aside from war, for T-2 mycotoxins; however, there are some plausible therapeutic uses. Due to their abilities, research shows possible uses for the mycotoxin as growth promoters, antibiotics, antivirals, as an antileukemic, and as an antimalarial.

== See also ==
- Yellow rain
