= Trichodiene synthase =

trichodiene synthase

Identifiers
- EC no.: 4.2.3.6
- CAS no.: 101915-76-8

Databases
- IntEnz: IntEnz view
- BRENDA: BRENDA entry
- ExPASy: NiceZyme view
- KEGG: KEGG entry
- MetaCyc: metabolic pathway
- PRIAM: profile
- PDB structures: RCSB PDB PDBe PDBsum
- Gene Ontology: AmiGO / QuickGO
Search
- PMC: articles
- PubMed: articles
- NCBI: proteins

The enzyme trichodiene synthase (EC 4.2.3.6) catalyzes the chemical reaction

(2E,6E)-farnesyl diphosphate $\rightleftharpoons$ trichodiene + diphosphate

This enzyme belongs to the family of lyases, specifically those carbon-oxygen lyases acting on phosphates. The systematic name of this enzyme class is (2E,6E)-farnesyl-diphosphate diphosphate-lyase (cyclizing, trichodiene-forming). Other names in common use include trichodiene synthetase, sesquiterpene cyclase, and trans,trans-farnesyl-diphosphate sesquiterpenoid-lyase. This enzyme participates in terpenoid biosynthesis.

== Structural studies ==
As of late 2007, 9 structures have been solved for this class of enzymes, with PDB accession codes 1YJ4, 1YYQ, 1YYR, 1YYS, 1YYT, 1YYU, 2AEK, 2AEL, and 2AET.
