= Phytoestrogen =

Plant-derived xenoestrogen

A phytoestrogen is a plant-derived xenoestrogen (a type of estrogen produced by organisms other than humans) not generated within the endocrine system, but consumed by eating plants or manufactured foods. Also called a "dietary estrogen", it is a diverse group of naturally occurring nonsteroidal plant compounds that, because of its structural similarity to estradiol (17-β-estradiol), have the ability to cause both estrogenic or antiestrogenic effects.

Phytoestrogens are not essential nutrients because their absence from the diet does not cause a disease, nor are they known to participate in any normal biological function. Common foods containing phytoestrogens are soybeans and soy protein concentrate, miso, tempeh, and tofu. Some soy-based infant formulas manufactured with soy protein contain isoflavones.

Its name comes from the Greek phyto ("plant") and estrogen, the hormone which gives fertility to female mammals. The word "estrus" (Greek οίστρος) means "sexual desire", and "gene" (Greek γόνο) is "to generate". It has been hypothesized that plants use a phytoestrogen as part of their natural defense against the overpopulation of herbivore animals by controlling female fertility.

The similarities, at the molecular level, of an estrogen and a phytoestrogen allow them to mildly mimic and sometimes act as an antagonist of estrogen. Phytoestrogens were first observed in 1926, but it was unknown if they could have any effect in human or animal metabolism. In the 1940s and early 1950s, it was noticed that some pastures of subterranean clover and red clover (phytoestrogen-rich plants) had adverse effects on the fecundity of grazing sheep.

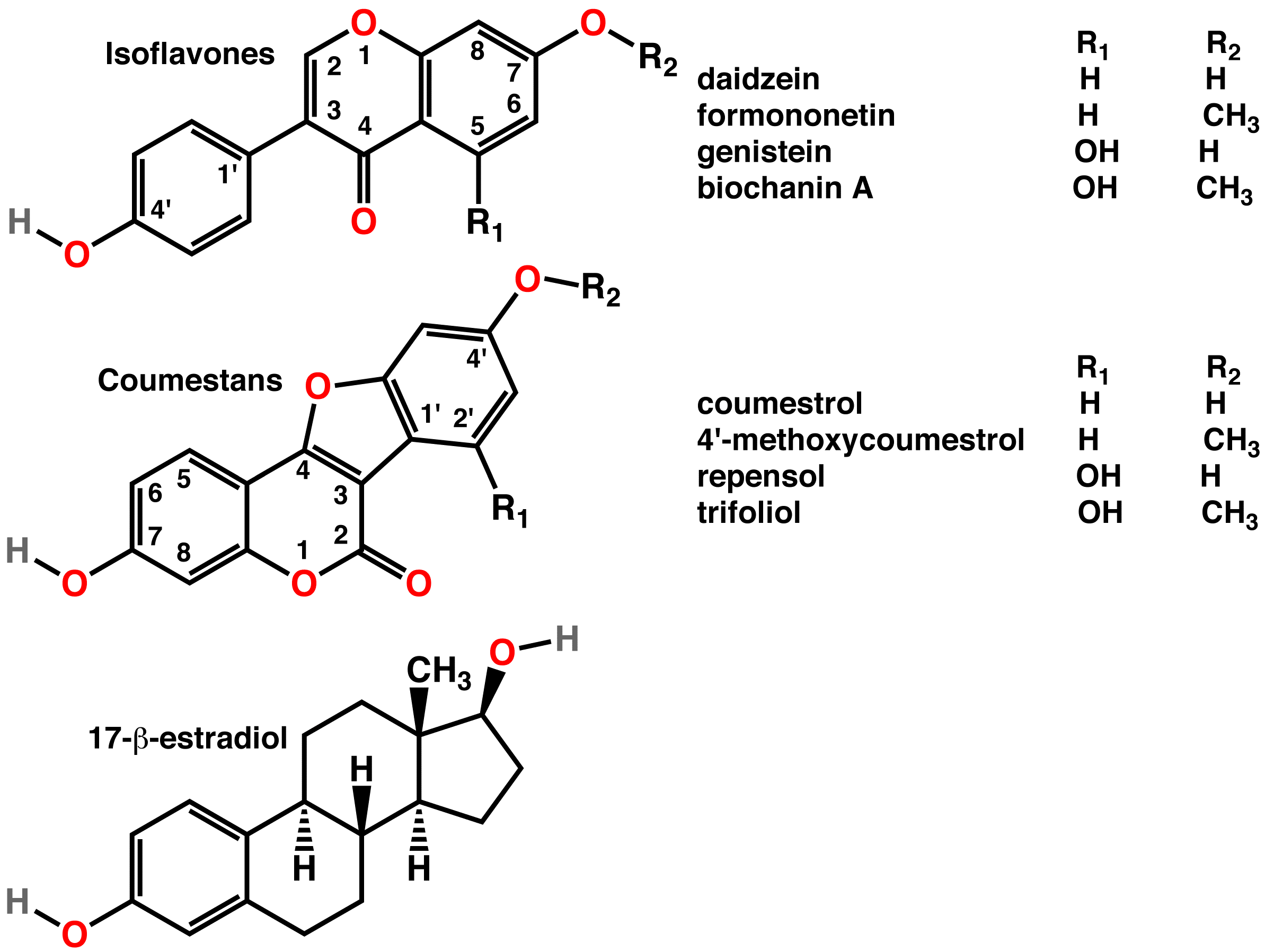
Chemical structures of the most common phytoestrogens found in plants (top and middle) compared with estrogen (bottom) found in animals

== Structure ==
Phytoestrogens mainly belong to a large group of substituted natural phenolic compounds: the coumestans, prenylflavonoids and isoflavones are three of the most active in estrogenic effects in this class. The best-researched are isoflavones, which are commonly found in soy and red clover. Lignans have also been identified as phytoestrogens, although they are not flavonoids. Mycoestrogens have similar structures and effects, but are not components of plants; these are mold metabolites of Fusarium, especially common on cereal grains, but also occurring elsewhere, e.g. on various forages. Although mycoestrogens are rarely taken into account in discussions about phytoestrogens, these are the compounds that initially generated the interest on the topic.

== Mechanism of action ==
Phytoestrogens exert their effects primarily through binding to estrogen receptors (ER). There are two variants of the estrogen receptor, alpha (ER-α) and beta (ER-β) and many phytoestrogens display somewhat higher affinity for ER-β compared to ER-α.

The key structural elements that enable phytoestrogens to bind with high affinity to estrogen receptors and display estradiol-like effects are:

- The phenolic ring that is indispensable for binding to estrogen receptor
- The ring of isoflavones mimicking a ring of estrogens at the receptors binding site
- Low molecular weight similar to estrogens (MW=272)
- Distance between two hydroxyl groups at the isoflavones nucleus similar to that occurring in estradiol
- Optimal hydroxylation pattern

In addition to interaction with ERs, phytoestrogens may also modulate the concentration of endogenous estrogens by binding or inactivating some enzymes, and may affect the bioavailability of sex hormones by depressing or stimulating the synthesis of sex hormone-binding globulin (SHBG).

Emerging evidence shows that some phytoestrogens bind to and transactivate peroxisome proliferator-activated receptors (PPARs). In vitro studies show an activation of PPARs at concentrations above 1 μM, which is higher than the activation level of ERs. At the concentration below 1 μM, activation of ERs may play a dominant role. At higher concentrations (>1 μM), both ERs and PPARs are activated. Studies have shown that both ERs and PPARs influence each other and therefore induce differential effects in a dose-dependent way. The final biological effects of genistein are determined by the balance among these pleiotrophic actions.

Affinities of estrogen receptor ligands for the ERα and ERβ
| Ligand | Other names | Relative binding affinities (RBA, %)^{a} | | Absolute binding affinities (K_{i}, nM)^{a} | | Action |
| Ligand | Other names | ERα | ERβ | ERα | ERβ | Action |
|---|---|---|---|---|---|---|
| Estradiol | E2; 17β-Estradiol | 100 | 100 | 0.115 (0.04–0.24) | 0.15 (0.10–2.08) | Estrogen |
| Estrone | E1; 17-Ketoestradiol | 16.39 (0.7–60) | 6.5 (1.36–52) | 0.445 (0.3–1.01) | 1.75 (0.35–9.24) | Estrogen |
| Estriol | E3; 16α-OH-17β-E2 | 12.65 (4.03–56) | 26 (14.0–44.6) | 0.45 (0.35–1.4) | 0.7 (0.63–0.7) | Estrogen |
| Estetrol | E4; 15α,16α-Di-OH-17β-E2 | 4.0 | 3.0 | 4.9 | 19 | Estrogen |
| Alfatradiol | 17α-Estradiol | 20.5 (7–80.1) | 8.195 (2–42) | 0.2–0.52 | 0.43–1.2 | Metabolite |
| 16-Epiestriol | 16β-Hydroxy-17β-estradiol | 7.795 (4.94–63) | 50 | ? | ? | Metabolite |
| 17-Epiestriol | 16α-Hydroxy-17α-estradiol | 55.45 (29–103) | 79–80 | ? | ? | Metabolite |
| 16,17-Epiestriol | 16β-Hydroxy-17α-estradiol | 1.0 | 13 | ? | ? | Metabolite |
| 2-Hydroxyestradiol | 2-OH-E2 | 22 (7–81) | 11–35 | 2.5 | 1.3 | Metabolite |
| 2-Methoxyestradiol | 2-MeO-E2 | 0.0027–2.0 | 1.0 | ? | ? | Metabolite |
| 4-Hydroxyestradiol | 4-OH-E2 | 13 (8–70) | 7–56 | 1.0 | 1.9 | Metabolite |
| 4-Methoxyestradiol | 4-MeO-E2 | 2.0 | 1.0 | ? | ? | Metabolite |
| 2-Hydroxyestrone | 2-OH-E1 | 2.0–4.0 | 0.2–0.4 | ? | ? | Metabolite |
| 2-Methoxyestrone | 2-MeO-E1 | <0.001–<1 | <1 | ? | ? | Metabolite |
| 4-Hydroxyestrone | 4-OH-E1 | 1.0–2.0 | 1.0 | ? | ? | Metabolite |
| 4-Methoxyestrone | 4-MeO-E1 | <1 | <1 | ? | ? | Metabolite |
| 16α-Hydroxyestrone | 16α-OH-E1; 17-Ketoestriol | 2.0–6.5 | 35 | ? | ? | Metabolite |
| 2-Hydroxyestriol | 2-OH-E3 | 2.0 | 1.0 | ? | ? | Metabolite |
| 4-Methoxyestriol | 4-MeO-E3 | 1.0 | 1.0 | ? | ? | Metabolite |
| Estradiol sulfate | E2S; Estradiol 3-sulfate | <1 | <1 | ? | ? | Metabolite |
| Estradiol disulfate | Estradiol 3,17β-disulfate | 0.0004 | ? | ? | ? | Metabolite |
| Estradiol 3-glucuronide | E2-3G | 0.0079 | ? | ? | ? | Metabolite |
| Estradiol 17β-glucuronide | E2-17G | 0.0015 | ? | ? | ? | Metabolite |
| Estradiol 3-gluc. 17β-sulfate | E2-3G-17S | 0.0001 | ? | ? | ? | Metabolite |
| Estrone sulfate | E1S; Estrone 3-sulfate | <1 | <1 | >10 | >10 | Metabolite |
| Estradiol benzoate | EB; Estradiol 3-benzoate | 10 | ? | ? | ? | Estrogen |
| Estradiol 17β-benzoate | E2-17B | 11.3 | 32.6 | ? | ? | Estrogen |
| Estrone methyl ether | Estrone 3-methyl ether | 0.145 | ? | ? | ? | Estrogen |
| ent-Estradiol | 1-Estradiol | 1.31–12.34 | 9.44–80.07 | ? | ? | Estrogen |
| Equilin | 7-Dehydroestrone | 13 (4.0–28.9) | 13.0–49 | 0.79 | 0.36 | Estrogen |
| Equilenin | 6,8-Didehydroestrone | 2.0–15 | 7.0–20 | 0.64 | 0.62 | Estrogen |
| 17β-Dihydroequilin | 7-Dehydro-17β-estradiol | 7.9–113 | 7.9–108 | 0.09 | 0.17 | Estrogen |
| 17α-Dihydroequilin | 7-Dehydro-17α-estradiol | 18.6 (18–41) | 14–32 | 0.24 | 0.57 | Estrogen |
| 17β-Dihydroequilenin | 6,8-Didehydro-17β-estradiol | 35–68 | 90–100 | 0.15 | 0.20 | Estrogen |
| 17α-Dihydroequilenin | 6,8-Didehydro-17α-estradiol | 20 | 49 | 0.50 | 0.37 | Estrogen |
| Δ^{8}-Estradiol | 8,9-Dehydro-17β-estradiol | 68 | 72 | 0.15 | 0.25 | Estrogen |
| Δ^{8}-Estrone | 8,9-Dehydroestrone | 19 | 32 | 0.52 | 0.57 | Estrogen |
| Ethinylestradiol | EE; 17α-Ethynyl-17β-E2 | 120.9 (68.8–480) | 44.4 (2.0–144) | 0.02–0.05 | 0.29–0.81 | Estrogen |
| Mestranol | EE 3-methyl ether | ? | 2.5 | ? | ? | Estrogen |
| Moxestrol | RU-2858; 11β-Methoxy-EE | 35–43 | 5–20 | 0.5 | 2.6 | Estrogen |
| Methylestradiol | 17α-Methyl-17β-estradiol | 70 | 44 | ? | ? | Estrogen |
| Diethylstilbestrol | DES; Stilbestrol | 129.5 (89.1–468) | 219.63 (61.2–295) | 0.04 | 0.05 | Estrogen |
| Hexestrol | Dihydrodiethylstilbestrol | 153.6 (31–302) | 60–234 | 0.06 | 0.06 | Estrogen |
| Dienestrol | Dehydrostilbestrol | 37 (20.4–223) | 56–404 | 0.05 | 0.03 | Estrogen |
| Benzestrol (B2) | – | 114 | ? | ? | ? | Estrogen |
| Chlorotrianisene | TACE | 1.74 | ? | 15.30 | ? | Estrogen |
| Triphenylethylene | TPE | 0.074 | ? | ? | ? | Estrogen |
| Triphenylbromoethylene | TPBE | 2.69 | ? | ? | ? | Estrogen |
| Tamoxifen | ICI-46,474 | 3 (0.1–47) | 3.33 (0.28–6) | 3.4–9.69 | 2.5 | SERM |
| Afimoxifene | 4-Hydroxytamoxifen; 4-OHT | 100.1 (1.7–257) | 10 (0.98–339) | 2.3 (0.1–3.61) | 0.04–4.8 | SERM |
| Toremifene | 4-Chlorotamoxifen; 4-CT | ? | ? | 7.14–20.3 | 15.4 | SERM |
| Clomifene | MRL-41 | 25 (19.2–37.2) | 12 | 0.9 | 1.2 | SERM |
| Cyclofenil | F-6066; Sexovid | 151–152 | 243 | ? | ? | SERM |
| Nafoxidine | U-11,000A | 30.9–44 | 16 | 0.3 | 0.8 | SERM |
| Raloxifene | – | 41.2 (7.8–69) | 5.34 (0.54–16) | 0.188–0.52 | 20.2 | SERM |
| Arzoxifene | LY-353,381 | ? | ? | 0.179 | ? | SERM |
| Lasofoxifene | CP-336,156 | 10.2–166 | 19.0 | 0.229 | ? | SERM |
| Ormeloxifene | Centchroman | ? | ? | 0.313 | ? | SERM |
| Levormeloxifene | 6720-CDRI; NNC-460,020 | 1.55 | 1.88 | ? | ? | SERM |
| Ospemifene | Deaminohydroxytoremifene | 0.82–2.63 | 0.59–1.22 | ? | ? | SERM |
| Bazedoxifene | – | ? | ? | 0.053 | ? | SERM |
| Etacstil | GW-5638 | 4.30 | 11.5 | ? | ? | SERM |
| ICI-164,384 | – | 63.5 (3.70–97.7) | 166 | 0.2 | 0.08 | Antiestrogen |
| Fulvestrant | ICI-182,780 | 43.5 (9.4–325) | 21.65 (2.05–40.5) | 0.42 | 1.3 | Antiestrogen |
| Propylpyrazoletriol | PPT | 49 (10.0–89.1) | 0.12 | 0.40 | 92.8 | ERα agonist |
| 16α-LE2 | 16α-Lactone-17β-estradiol | 14.6–57 | 0.089 | 0.27 | 131 | ERα agonist |
| 16α-Iodo-E2 | 16α-Iodo-17β-estradiol | 30.2 | 2.30 | ? | ? | ERα agonist |
| Methylpiperidinopyrazole | MPP | 11 | 0.05 | ? | ? | ERα antagonist |
| Diarylpropionitrile | DPN | 0.12–0.25 | 6.6–18 | 32.4 | 1.7 | ERβ agonist |
| 8β-VE2 | 8β-Vinyl-17β-estradiol | 0.35 | 22.0–83 | 12.9 | 0.50 | ERβ agonist |
| Prinaberel | ERB-041; WAY-202,041 | 0.27 | 67–72 | ? | ? | ERβ agonist |
| ERB-196 | WAY-202,196 | ? | 180 | ? | ? | ERβ agonist |
| Erteberel | SERBA-1; LY-500,307 | ? | ? | 2.68 | 0.19 | ERβ agonist |
| SERBA-2 | – | ? | ? | 14.5 | 1.54 | ERβ agonist |
| Coumestrol | – | 9.225 (0.0117–94) | 64.125 (0.41–185) | 0.14–80.0 | 0.07–27.0 | Xenoestrogen |
| Genistein | – | 0.445 (0.0012–16) | 33.42 (0.86–87) | 2.6–126 | 0.3–12.8 | Xenoestrogen |
| Equol | – | 0.2–0.287 | 0.85 (0.10–2.85) | ? | ? | Xenoestrogen |
| Daidzein | – | 0.07 (0.0018–9.3) | 0.7865 (0.04–17.1) | 2.0 | 85.3 | Xenoestrogen |
| Biochanin A | – | 0.04 (0.022–0.15) | 0.6225 (0.010–1.2) | 174 | 8.9 | Xenoestrogen |
| Kaempferol | – | 0.07 (0.029–0.10) | 2.2 (0.002–3.00) | ? | ? | Xenoestrogen |
| Naringenin | – | 0.0054 (<0.001–0.01) | 0.15 (0.11–0.33) | ? | ? | Xenoestrogen |
| 8-Prenylnaringenin | 8-PN | 4.4 | ? | ? | ? | Xenoestrogen |
| Quercetin | – | <0.001–0.01 | 0.002–0.040 | ? | ? | Xenoestrogen |
| Ipriflavone | – | <0.01 | <0.01 | ? | ? | Xenoestrogen |
| Miroestrol | – | 0.39 | ? | ? | ? | Xenoestrogen |
| Deoxymiroestrol | – | 2.0 | ? | ? | ? | Xenoestrogen |
| β-Sitosterol | – | <0.001–0.0875 | <0.001–0.016 | ? | ? | Xenoestrogen |
| Resveratrol | – | <0.001–0.0032 | ? | ? | ? | Xenoestrogen |
| α-Zearalenol | – | 48 (13–52.5) | ? | ? | ? | Xenoestrogen |
| β-Zearalenol | – | 0.6 (0.032–13) | ? | ? | ? | Xenoestrogen |
| Zeranol | α-Zearalanol | 48–111 | ? | ? | ? | Xenoestrogen |
| Taleranol | β-Zearalanol | 16 (13–17.8) | 14 | 0.8 | 0.9 | Xenoestrogen |
| Zearalenone | ZEN | 7.68 (2.04–28) | 9.45 (2.43–31.5) | ? | ? | Xenoestrogen |
| Zearalanone | ZAN | 0.51 | ? | ? | ? | Xenoestrogen |
| Bisphenol A | BPA | 0.0315 (0.008–1.0) | 0.135 (0.002–4.23) | 195 | 35 | Xenoestrogen |
| Endosulfan | EDS | <0.001–<0.01 | <0.01 | ? | ? | Xenoestrogen |
| Kepone | Chlordecone | 0.0069–0.2 | ? | ? | ? | Xenoestrogen |
| o,p'-DDT | – | 0.0073–0.4 | ? | ? | ? | Xenoestrogen |
| p,p'-DDT | – | 0.03 | ? | ? | ? | Xenoestrogen |
| Methoxychlor | p,p'-Dimethoxy-DDT | 0.01 (<0.001–0.02) | 0.01–0.13 | ? | ? | Xenoestrogen |
| HPTE | Hydroxychlor; p,p'-OH-DDT | 1.2–1.7 | ? | ? | ? | Xenoestrogen |
| Testosterone | T; 4-Androstenolone | <0.0001–<0.01 | <0.002–0.040 | >5000 | >5000 | Androgen |
| Dihydrotestosterone | DHT; 5α-Androstanolone | 0.01 (<0.001–0.05) | 0.0059–0.17 | 221–>5000 | 73–1688 | Androgen |
| Nandrolone | 19-Nortestosterone; 19-NT | 0.01 | 0.23 | 765 | 53 | Androgen |
| Dehydroepiandrosterone | DHEA; Prasterone | 0.038 (<0.001–0.04) | 0.019–0.07 | 245–1053 | 163–515 | Androgen |
| 5-Androstenediol | A5; Androstenediol | 6 | 17 | 3.6 | 0.9 | Androgen |
| 4-Androstenediol | – | 0.5 | 0.6 | 23 | 19 | Androgen |
| 4-Androstenedione | A4; Androstenedione | <0.01 | <0.01 | >10000 | >10000 | Androgen |
| 3α-Androstanediol | 3α-Adiol | 0.07 | 0.3 | 260 | 48 | Androgen |
| 3β-Androstanediol | 3β-Adiol | 3 | 7 | 6 | 2 | Androgen |
| Androstanedione | 5α-Androstanedione | <0.01 | <0.01 | >10000 | >10000 | Androgen |
| Etiocholanedione | 5β-Androstanedione | <0.01 | <0.01 | >10000 | >10000 | Androgen |
| Methyltestosterone | 17α-Methyltestosterone | <0.0001 | ? | ? | ? | Androgen |
| Ethinyl-3α-androstanediol | 17α-Ethynyl-3α-adiol | 4.0 | <0.07 | ? | ? | Estrogen |
| Ethinyl-3β-androstanediol | 17α-Ethynyl-3β-adiol | 50 | 5.6 | ? | ? | Estrogen |
| Progesterone | P4; 4-Pregnenedione | <0.001–0.6 | <0.001–0.010 | ? | ? | Progestogen |
| Norethisterone | NET; 17α-Ethynyl-19-NT | 0.085 (0.0015–<0.1) | 0.1 (0.01–0.3) | 152 | 1084 | Progestogen |
| Norethynodrel | 5(10)-Norethisterone | 0.5 (0.3–0.7) | <0.1–0.22 | 14 | 53 | Progestogen |
| Tibolone | 7α-Methylnorethynodrel | 0.5 (0.45–2.0) | 0.2–0.076 | ? | ? | Progestogen |
| Δ^{4}-Tibolone | 7α-Methylnorethisterone | 0.069–<0.1 | 0.027–<0.1 | ? | ? | Progestogen |
| 3α-Hydroxytibolone | – | 2.5 (1.06–5.0) | 0.6–0.8 | ? | ? | Progestogen |
| 3β-Hydroxytibolone | – | 1.6 (0.75–1.9) | 0.070–0.1 | ? | ? | Progestogen |
Footnotes: ^{a} = (1) Binding affinity values are of the format "median (range)" (# (#–#)), "range" (#–#), or "value" (#) depending on the values available. The full sets of values within the ranges can be found in the Wiki code. (2) Binding affinities were determined via displacement studies in a variety of in-vitro systems with labeled estradiol and human ERα and ERβ proteins (except the ERβ values from Kuiper et al. (1997), which are rat ERβ). Sources: See template page.

== Ecology ==
Phytoestrogens are involved in the synthesis of antifungal benzofurans and phytoalexins, such as medicarpin (common in legumes), and sesquiterpenes, such as capsidiol in tobacco. Soybeans naturally produce isoflavones, and are therefore a dietary source for isoflavones.

Phytoestrogens are ancient naturally occurring substances, and as dietary phytochemicals they are considered to have coevolved with mammals. In the human diet, phytoestrogens are not the only source of exogenous estrogens. Xenoestrogens (novel, man-made), are found as food additives and ingredients, and also in cosmetics, plastics, and insecticides. Environmentally, they have similar effects as phytoestrogens, making it difficult to clearly separate the action of these two kind of agents in studies.

== Avian studies ==
The consumption of plants with unusual content of phytoestrogens, under drought conditions, has been shown to decrease fertility in quail. Parrot food as available in nature has shown only weak estrogenic activity. Studies have been conducted on screening methods for environmental estrogens present in manufactured supplementary food, with the purpose of aiding reproduction of endangered species.

== Food sources ==
Soy-based food products, such as soybeans, miso, tempeh, tofu, meatless soy burgers, and soy protein infant foods contain the highest amounts of isoflavones.

According to a 2006 study of nine common phytoestrogens in Canadian foods, the highest relative phytoestrogen content were nuts and oilseeds, followed by soy products, cereals and breads, legumes, meat products, and other processed foods that may contain soy, vegetables, fruits, alcoholic, and nonalcoholic beverages. The highest concentrations of isoflavones are found in soybeans and soybean products followed by legumes, whereas lignans are the primary source of phytoestrogens found in nuts and oilseeds (e.g. flax) and also found in cereals, legumes, fruits and vegetables. Phytoestrogen content varies in different foods, and may vary significantly within the same group of foods (e.g. soy beverages, tofu) depending on processing mechanisms and type of soybean used. Legumes (in particular soybeans), whole grain cereals, and some seeds are high in phytoestrogens.

Food content of phytoestrogens is highly variable, and accurate estimates of intake are therefore difficult and depends on the databases used. Data from the European Prospective Investigation into Cancer and Nutrition found intakes between 1 mg/d in Mediterranean Countries and more than 20 mg/d in the United Kingdom.

== Effects on humans ==
In humans, phytoestrogens are digested in the small intestine, poorly absorbed into the circulatory system, circulate in plasma, and are excreted in the urine. Metabolic influence is different from that of grazing animals due to the differences between ruminant versus monogastric digestive systems.

As of 2020, there is insufficient clinical evidence to determine that phytoestrogens have effects in humans.

=== Females ===
It is unclear if phytoestrogens have any effect on the cause or prevention of cancer in women. Some epidemiological studies have suggested a protective effect against breast cancer. Additionally, other epidemiological studies found that consumption of soy estrogens is safe for patients with breast cancer, and that it may decrease mortality and recurrence rates. It remains unclear if phytoestrogens can minimize some of the deleterious effects of low estrogen levels (hypoestrogenism) resulting from oophorectomy, menopause, or other causes. A Cochrane review of the use of phytoestrogens to relieve the vasomotor symptoms of menopause (hot flashes) stated that there was no conclusive evidence to suggest any benefit to their use, although genistein effects should be further investigated. A 2024 evidence map separately identified 31 randomized controlled trials of 20 different phytoestrogen products tested for the genitourinary symptoms of menopause, though most used different formulations or doses, which prevented the results from being combined.

=== Males ===
It remains under study whether phytoestrogens have any effect on male reproductive physiology. Some studies showed that isoflavone supplementation had a positive effect on sperm concentration, count, or motility, and increased ejaculate volume. Dietary intake of isoflavones at levels greater than in typical Asian diets does not affect estrogen, testosterone, sperm or semen amounts.

Reviews of available studies found no link of phytoestrogens on male fertility, and instead indicate that diets, such as the Mediterranean diet, might have a positive effect on male fertility. Neither isoflavones nor soy have been shown to affect male reproductive hormones in healthy individuals.

=== Infant formula ===
Infant formulas made with soy protein phytoestrogens are considered safe alternatives to formulas containing dairy ingredients, which may be excluded for infants with galactosemia and hereditary lactose intolerance.

Some reviews express the opinion that more research is needed to answer the question of what effect phytoestrogens may have on infants, but their authors did not find any adverse effects. Studies conclude there are no adverse effects in human growth, development, or reproduction as a result of the consumption of soy-based infant formula compared to conventional cow-milk formula. The American Academy of Pediatrics states: "although isolated soy protein-based formulas may be used to provide nutrition for normal growth and development, there are few indications for their use in place of cow milk-based formula. These indications include (a) for infants with galactosemia and hereditary lactase deficiency (rare) and (b) in situations in which a vegetarian diet is preferred."

== Ethnopharmacology ==
In some countries, phytoestrogenic plants have been used historically in the belief they can treat menstrual, menopausal, and fertility effects. Plants containing phytoestrogens include Pueraria mirifica and kudzu.

== See also ==
- Ethnopharmacology
- Mycoestrogens
- Phytoandrogens
- Plant hormone
