= Xenoestrogen =

Compounds from outside the body that mimic estrogen

Xenoestrogens are a type of xenohormone that imitates estrogen. They can be either synthetic or natural chemical compounds. Synthetic xenoestrogens include some widely used industrial compounds, such as PCBs, BPA, and phthalates, which have estrogenic effects on a living organism even though they differ chemically from the estrogenic substances produced internally by the endocrine system of any organism. Natural xenoestrogens include phytoestrogens which are plant-derived xenoestrogens. Because the primary route of exposure to these compounds is by consumption of phytoestrogenic plants, they are sometimes called "dietary estrogens". Mycoestrogens, estrogenic substances from fungi, are another type of xenoestrogen that are also considered mycotoxins.

Xenoestrogens are clinically significant because they can mimic the effects of endogenous estrogen and thus have been implicated in precocious puberty and other disorders of the reproductive system.

Xenoestrogens include pharmacological estrogens (in which estrogenic action is an intended effect, as in the drug ethinylestradiol used in contraceptive pills), but other chemicals may also have estrogenic effects. Xenoestrogens have been introduced into the environment by industrial, agricultural and chemical companies and consumers only in the last 70 years or so, but archiestrogens exist naturally. Some plants (like the cereals and the legumes) are using estrogenic substances possibly as part of their natural defence against herbivore animals by controlling their fertility.

The potential ecological and human health impact of xenoestrogens is of growing concern. The word xenoestrogen is derived from the Greek words ξένο xeno 'foreign', οἶστρος oistros 'sexual desire', and γόνο gono 'to generate', and it literally means 'foreign estrogen'. Xenoestrogens are also called "environmental hormones" or "EDC" (Endocrine Disrupting Compounds, or Endocrine disruptor for short). Most scientists that study xenoestrogens, including The Endocrine Society, regard them as serious environmental hazards that have hormone disruptive effects on both wildlife and humans.

== Mechanism of action ==
The onset of puberty is characterized by increased levels of hypothalamic gonadotropin releasing hormone (GnRH). GnRH triggers the secretion of luteinizing hormone (LH) and follicle-stimulating hormone (FSH) from the anterior pituitary gland, which in turn causes the ovaries to respond and secrete estradiol. Increases in gonadal estrogen promote breast development, female fat distribution and skeletal growth. Adrenal androgen and gonadal androgen result in pubic and axillary hair. Peripheral precocious puberty caused by exogenous estrogens is evaluated by assessing decreased levels of gonadotrophins.

Xenoestrogens in plastics, packaged food, drink trays and containers, (more so, when they've been heated in the sun, or an oven), may interfere with pubertal development by actions at different levels – hypothalamic-pituitary axis, gonads, peripheral target organs such as the breast, hair follicles and genitals. Exogenous chemicals that mimic estrogen can alter the functions of the endocrine system and cause various health defects by interfering with synthesis, metabolism, binding or cellular responses of natural estrogens.

Although the physiology of the reproductive system is complex, the action of environmental exogenous estrogens is hypothesized to occur by two possible mechanisms. Xenoestrogens may temporarily or permanently alter the feedback loops in the brain, pituitary, gonads, and thyroid by mimicking the effects of estrogen and triggering their specific receptors or they may bind to hormone receptors and block the action of natural hormones. Thus it is plausible that environmental estrogens can accelerate sexual development if present in a sufficient concentration or with chronic exposure. The similarity in the structure of exogenous estrogens and the estrogens has changed the hormone balance within the body and resulted in various reproductive problems in females. The overall mechanism of action is binding of the exogenous compounds that mimic estrogen to the estrogen binding receptors and cause the determined action in the target organs.

Affinities of estrogen receptor ligands for the ERα and ERβ
Ligand	Other names	Relative binding affinities (RBA, %)^{a}		Absolute binding affinities (K_{i}, nM)^{a}		Action
Ligand	Other names	ERα	ERβ	ERα	ERβ	Action
Estradiol	E2; 17β-Estradiol	100	100	0.115 (0.04–0.24)	0.15 (0.10–2.08)	Estrogen
Estrone	E1; 17-Ketoestradiol	16.39 (0.7–60)	6.5 (1.36–52)	0.445 (0.3–1.01)	1.75 (0.35–9.24)	Estrogen
Estriol	E3; 16α-OH-17β-E2	12.65 (4.03–56)	26 (14.0–44.6)	0.45 (0.35–1.4)	0.7 (0.63–0.7)	Estrogen
Estetrol	E4; 15α,16α-Di-OH-17β-E2	4.0	3.0	4.9	19	Estrogen
Alfatradiol	17α-Estradiol	20.5 (7–80.1)	8.195 (2–42)	0.2–0.52	0.43–1.2	Metabolite
16-Epiestriol	16β-Hydroxy-17β-estradiol	7.795 (4.94–63)	50	?	?	Metabolite
17-Epiestriol	16α-Hydroxy-17α-estradiol	55.45 (29–103)	79–80	?	?	Metabolite
16,17-Epiestriol	16β-Hydroxy-17α-estradiol	1.0	13	?	?	Metabolite
2-Hydroxyestradiol	2-OH-E2	22 (7–81)	11–35	2.5	1.3	Metabolite
2-Methoxyestradiol	2-MeO-E2	0.0027–2.0	1.0	?	?	Metabolite
4-Hydroxyestradiol	4-OH-E2	13 (8–70)	7–56	1.0	1.9	Metabolite
4-Methoxyestradiol	4-MeO-E2	2.0	1.0	?	?	Metabolite
2-Hydroxyestrone	2-OH-E1	2.0–4.0	0.2–0.4	?	?	Metabolite
2-Methoxyestrone	2-MeO-E1	<0.001–<1	<1	?	?	Metabolite
4-Hydroxyestrone	4-OH-E1	1.0–2.0	1.0	?	?	Metabolite
4-Methoxyestrone	4-MeO-E1	<1	<1	?	?	Metabolite
16α-Hydroxyestrone	16α-OH-E1; 17-Ketoestriol	2.0–6.5	35	?	?	Metabolite
2-Hydroxyestriol	2-OH-E3	2.0	1.0	?	?	Metabolite
4-Methoxyestriol	4-MeO-E3	1.0	1.0	?	?	Metabolite
Estradiol sulfate	E2S; Estradiol 3-sulfate	<1	<1	?	?	Metabolite
Estradiol disulfate	Estradiol 3,17β-disulfate	0.0004	?	?	?	Metabolite
Estradiol 3-glucuronide	E2-3G	0.0079	?	?	?	Metabolite
Estradiol 17β-glucuronide	E2-17G	0.0015	?	?	?	Metabolite
Estradiol 3-gluc. 17β-sulfate	E2-3G-17S	0.0001	?	?	?	Metabolite
Estrone sulfate	E1S; Estrone 3-sulfate	<1	<1	>10	>10	Metabolite
Estradiol benzoate	EB; Estradiol 3-benzoate	10	?	?	?	Estrogen
Estradiol 17β-benzoate	E2-17B	11.3	32.6	?	?	Estrogen
Estrone methyl ether	Estrone 3-methyl ether	0.145	?	?	?	Estrogen
ent-Estradiol	1-Estradiol	1.31–12.34	9.44–80.07	?	?	Estrogen
Equilin	7-Dehydroestrone	13 (4.0–28.9)	13.0–49	0.79	0.36	Estrogen
Equilenin	6,8-Didehydroestrone	2.0–15	7.0–20	0.64	0.62	Estrogen
17β-Dihydroequilin	7-Dehydro-17β-estradiol	7.9–113	7.9–108	0.09	0.17	Estrogen
17α-Dihydroequilin	7-Dehydro-17α-estradiol	18.6 (18–41)	14–32	0.24	0.57	Estrogen
17β-Dihydroequilenin	6,8-Didehydro-17β-estradiol	35–68	90–100	0.15	0.20	Estrogen
17α-Dihydroequilenin	6,8-Didehydro-17α-estradiol	20	49	0.50	0.37	Estrogen
Δ^{8}-Estradiol	8,9-Dehydro-17β-estradiol	68	72	0.15	0.25	Estrogen
Δ^{8}-Estrone	8,9-Dehydroestrone	19	32	0.52	0.57	Estrogen
Ethinylestradiol	EE; 17α-Ethynyl-17β-E2	120.9 (68.8–480)	44.4 (2.0–144)	0.02–0.05	0.29–0.81	Estrogen
Mestranol	EE 3-methyl ether	?	2.5	?	?	Estrogen
Moxestrol	RU-2858; 11β-Methoxy-EE	35–43	5–20	0.5	2.6	Estrogen
Methylestradiol	17α-Methyl-17β-estradiol	70	44	?	?	Estrogen
Diethylstilbestrol	DES; Stilbestrol	129.5 (89.1–468)	219.63 (61.2–295)	0.04	0.05	Estrogen
Hexestrol	Dihydrodiethylstilbestrol	153.6 (31–302)	60–234	0.06	0.06	Estrogen
Dienestrol	Dehydrostilbestrol	37 (20.4–223)	56–404	0.05	0.03	Estrogen
Benzestrol (B2)	–	114	?	?	?	Estrogen
Chlorotrianisene	TACE	1.74	?	15.30	?	Estrogen
Triphenylethylene	TPE	0.074	?	?	?	Estrogen
Triphenylbromoethylene	TPBE	2.69	?	?	?	Estrogen
Tamoxifen	ICI-46,474	3 (0.1–47)	3.33 (0.28–6)	3.4–9.69	2.5	SERM
Afimoxifene	4-Hydroxytamoxifen; 4-OHT	100.1 (1.7–257)	10 (0.98–339)	2.3 (0.1–3.61)	0.04–4.8	SERM
Toremifene	4-Chlorotamoxifen; 4-CT	?	?	7.14–20.3	15.4	SERM
Clomifene	MRL-41	25 (19.2–37.2)	12	0.9	1.2	SERM
Cyclofenil	F-6066; Sexovid	151–152	243	?	?	SERM
Nafoxidine	U-11,000A	30.9–44	16	0.3	0.8	SERM
Raloxifene	–	41.2 (7.8–69)	5.34 (0.54–16)	0.188–0.52	20.2	SERM
Arzoxifene	LY-353,381	?	?	0.179	?	SERM
Lasofoxifene	CP-336,156	10.2–166	19.0	0.229	?	SERM
Ormeloxifene	Centchroman	?	?	0.313	?	SERM
Levormeloxifene	6720-CDRI; NNC-460,020	1.55	1.88	?	?	SERM
Ospemifene	Deaminohydroxytoremifene	0.82–2.63	0.59–1.22	?	?	SERM
Bazedoxifene	–	?	?	0.053	?	SERM
Etacstil	GW-5638	4.30	11.5	?	?	SERM
ICI-164,384	–	63.5 (3.70–97.7)	166	0.2	0.08	Antiestrogen
Fulvestrant	ICI-182,780	43.5 (9.4–325)	21.65 (2.05–40.5)	0.42	1.3	Antiestrogen
Propylpyrazoletriol	PPT	49 (10.0–89.1)	0.12	0.40	92.8	ERα agonist
16α-LE2	16α-Lactone-17β-estradiol	14.6–57	0.089	0.27	131	ERα agonist
16α-Iodo-E2	16α-Iodo-17β-estradiol	30.2	2.30	?	?	ERα agonist
Methylpiperidinopyrazole	MPP	11	0.05	?	?	ERα antagonist
Diarylpropionitrile	DPN	0.12–0.25	6.6–18	32.4	1.7	ERβ agonist
8β-VE2	8β-Vinyl-17β-estradiol	0.35	22.0–83	12.9	0.50	ERβ agonist
Prinaberel	ERB-041; WAY-202,041	0.27	67–72	?	?	ERβ agonist
ERB-196	WAY-202,196	?	180	?	?	ERβ agonist
Erteberel	SERBA-1; LY-500,307	?	?	2.68	0.19	ERβ agonist
SERBA-2	–	?	?	14.5	1.54	ERβ agonist
Coumestrol	–	9.225 (0.0117–94)	64.125 (0.41–185)	0.14–80.0	0.07–27.0	Xenoestrogen
Genistein	–	0.445 (0.0012–16)	33.42 (0.86–87)	2.6–126	0.3–12.8	Xenoestrogen
Equol	–	0.2–0.287	0.85 (0.10–2.85)	?	?	Xenoestrogen
Daidzein	–	0.07 (0.0018–9.3)	0.7865 (0.04–17.1)	2.0	85.3	Xenoestrogen
Biochanin A	–	0.04 (0.022–0.15)	0.6225 (0.010–1.2)	174	8.9	Xenoestrogen
Kaempferol	–	0.07 (0.029–0.10)	2.2 (0.002–3.00)	?	?	Xenoestrogen
Naringenin	–	0.0054 (<0.001–0.01)	0.15 (0.11–0.33)	?	?	Xenoestrogen
8-Prenylnaringenin	8-PN	4.4	?	?	?	Xenoestrogen
Quercetin	–	<0.001–0.01	0.002–0.040	?	?	Xenoestrogen
Ipriflavone	–	<0.01	<0.01	?	?	Xenoestrogen
Miroestrol	–	0.39	?	?	?	Xenoestrogen
Deoxymiroestrol	–	2.0	?	?	?	Xenoestrogen
β-Sitosterol	–	<0.001–0.0875	<0.001–0.016	?	?	Xenoestrogen
Resveratrol	–	<0.001–0.0032	?	?	?	Xenoestrogen
α-Zearalenol	–	48 (13–52.5)	?	?	?	Xenoestrogen
β-Zearalenol	–	0.6 (0.032–13)	?	?	?	Xenoestrogen
Zeranol	α-Zearalanol	48–111	?	?	?	Xenoestrogen
Taleranol	β-Zearalanol	16 (13–17.8)	14	0.8	0.9	Xenoestrogen
Zearalenone	ZEN	7.68 (2.04–28)	9.45 (2.43–31.5)	?	?	Xenoestrogen
Zearalanone	ZAN	0.51	?	?	?	Xenoestrogen
Bisphenol A	BPA	0.0315 (0.008–1.0)	0.135 (0.002–4.23)	195	35	Xenoestrogen
Endosulfan	EDS	<0.001–<0.01	<0.01	?	?	Xenoestrogen
Kepone	Chlordecone	0.0069–0.2	?	?	?	Xenoestrogen
o,p'-DDT	–	0.0073–0.4	?	?	?	Xenoestrogen
p,p'-DDT	–	0.03	?	?	?	Xenoestrogen
Methoxychlor	p,p'-Dimethoxy-DDT	0.01 (<0.001–0.02)	0.01–0.13	?	?	Xenoestrogen
HPTE	Hydroxychlor; p,p'-OH-DDT	1.2–1.7	?	?	?	Xenoestrogen
Testosterone	T; 4-Androstenolone	<0.0001–<0.01	<0.002–0.040	>5000	>5000	Androgen
Dihydrotestosterone	DHT; 5α-Androstanolone	0.01 (<0.001–0.05)	0.0059–0.17	221–>5000	73–1688	Androgen
Nandrolone	19-Nortestosterone; 19-NT	0.01	0.23	765	53	Androgen
Dehydroepiandrosterone	DHEA; Prasterone	0.038 (<0.001–0.04)	0.019–0.07	245–1053	163–515	Androgen
5-Androstenediol	A5; Androstenediol	6	17	3.6	0.9	Androgen
4-Androstenediol	–	0.5	0.6	23	19	Androgen
4-Androstenedione	A4; Androstenedione	<0.01	<0.01	>10000	>10000	Androgen
3α-Androstanediol	3α-Adiol	0.07	0.3	260	48	Androgen
3β-Androstanediol	3β-Adiol	3	7	6	2	Androgen
Androstanedione	5α-Androstanedione	<0.01	<0.01	>10000	>10000	Androgen
Etiocholanedione	5β-Androstanedione	<0.01	<0.01	>10000	>10000	Androgen
Methyltestosterone	17α-Methyltestosterone	<0.0001	?	?	?	Androgen
Ethinyl-3α-androstanediol	17α-Ethynyl-3α-adiol	4.0	<0.07	?	?	Estrogen
Ethinyl-3β-androstanediol	17α-Ethynyl-3β-adiol	50	5.6	?	?	Estrogen
Progesterone	P4; 4-Pregnenedione	<0.001–0.6	<0.001–0.010	?	?	Progestogen
Norethisterone	NET; 17α-Ethynyl-19-NT	0.085 (0.0015–<0.1)	0.1 (0.01–0.3)	152	1084	Progestogen
Norethynodrel	5(10)-Norethisterone	0.5 (0.3–0.7)	<0.1–0.22	14	53	Progestogen
Tibolone	7α-Methylnorethynodrel	0.5 (0.45–2.0)	0.2–0.076	?	?	Progestogen
Δ^{4}-Tibolone	7α-Methylnorethisterone	0.069–<0.1	0.027–<0.1	?	?	Progestogen
3α-Hydroxytibolone	–	2.5 (1.06–5.0)	0.6–0.8	?	?	Progestogen
3β-Hydroxytibolone	–	1.6 (0.75–1.9)	0.070–0.1	?	?	Progestogen
Footnotes: ^{a} = (1) Binding affinity values are of the format "median (range)" (# (#–#)), "range" (#–#), or "value" (#) depending on the values available. The full sets of values within the ranges can be found in the Wiki code. (2) Binding affinities were determined via displacement studies in a variety of in-vitro systems with labeled estradiol and human ERα and ERβ proteins (except the ERβ values from Kuiper et al. (1997), which are rat ERβ). Sources: See template page.

== Effects ==
Xenoestrogens have been implicated in a variety of medical problems, and during the last 10 years many scientific studies have found hard evidence of adverse effects on human and animal health.

There is a concern that xenoestrogens may act as false messengers and disrupt the process of reproduction. Xenoestrogens, like all estrogens, can increase growth of the endometrium, so treatments for endometriosis include avoidance of products which contain them. Likewise, they are avoided in order to prevent the onset or aggravation of adenomyosis. Studies have implicated observations of disturbances in wildlife with estrogenic exposure. For example, discharge from human settlement including runoff and water flowing out of wastewater treatment plants release a large amount of xenoestrogens into streams, which lead to immense alterations in aquatic life. With a bioaccumulation factor of 10^{5} –10^{6}, fish are extremely susceptible to pollutants. Streams in more arid conditions are thought to have more effects due to higher concentrations of the chemicals arising from lack of dilution.

When comparing fish from above a wastewater treatment plant and below a wastewater treatment plant, studies found disrupted ovarian and testicular histopathology, gonadal intersex, reduced gonad size, vitellogenin induction, and altered sex ratios.

The sex ratios are female biased because xenoestrogens interrupt gonadal configuration causing complete or partial sex reversal. When comparing adjacent populations of white sucker fish, the exposed female fish can have up to five oocyte stages and asynchronously developing ovaries versus the unexposed female fish who usually have two oocyte stages and group-synchronously developing ovaries. Previously, this type of difference has only been found between tropical and temperate species.

Sperm concentrations and motility perimeters are reduced in male fish exposed to xenoestrogens in addition to disrupt stages of spermatogenesis. Moreover, xenoestrogens have been leading to vast amounts of intersex in fish. For example, one study indicates the numbers of intersex in white sucker fish to be equal to the number of males in the population downstream of a wastewater treatment plant. No intersex members were found upstream from the plant. Also, they found differences in the proportion of testicular and ovarian tissue and its degree of organization between the intersex fish. Furthermore, xenoestrogens expose fish to CYP1A inducers through inhibiting a putative labile protein and enhancing the Ah receptor, which has been linked to epizootics of cancer and the initiation of tumors.

The induction of CYP1A has been established to be a good bioindicator for xenoestrogen exposure. In addition, xenoestrogens stimulate vitellogenin (Vtg), which acts as a nutrient reserve, and Zona readiata proteins (Zrp), which forms eggshells. Therefore, Vtg and Zrp are biomarkers to exposure for fish.

Another potential effect of xenoestrogens is on oncogenes, specifically in relation to breast cancer. Some scientists doubt that xenoestrogens have any significant biological effect, in the concentrations found in the environment. However, there is substantial evidence in a variety of recent studies to indicate that xenoestrogens can increase breast cancer growth in tissue culture.

It has been suggested that very low levels of a xenoestrogen, Bisphenol A, could affect fetal neural signalling more than higher levels, indicating that classical models where dose equals response may not be applicable in susceptible tissue. As this study involved intra-cerebellar injections, its relevance to environmental exposures is unclear, as is the role of an estrogenic effect compared to some other toxic effect of bisphenol A.

Other scientists argue that the observed effects are spurious and inconsistent, or that the quantities of the agents are too low to have any effect. A 1997 survey of scientists in fields pertinent to evaluating estrogens found that 13 percent regarded the health threats from xenoestrogens as "major," 62 percent as "minor" or "none," and 25 percent were unsure.

There has been speculation that falling sperm counts in males may be due to increased estrogen exposure in utero. Sharpe in a 2005 review indicated that external estrogenic substances are too weak in their cumulative effects to alter male reproductive functioning, but indicates that the situation appears to be more complex as external chemicals may affect the internal testosterone-estrogen balance.

=== Impact ===
The ubiquitous presence of such estrogenic substances is a significant health concern, both individually and for a population. Life relies on the transmission of biochemical information to the next generation, and the presence of xenoestrogens may interfere with this transgenerational information process through "chemical confusion" (Vidaeff and Sever), who state: "The results do not support with certainty the view that environmental estrogens contribute to an increase in male reproductive disorders, neither do they provide sufficient grounds to reject such a hypothesis."

A 2008 report demonstrates further evidence of widespread effects of feminizing chemicals on male development in each class of vertebrate species as a worldwide phenomenon. Ninety-nine percent of over 100,000 recently introduced chemicals are underregulated, according to the European Commission.

Agencies such as the United States Environmental Protection Agency and the World Health Organization International Programme on Chemical Safety are charged to address these issues.

=== Precocious puberty ===
Puberty is a complex developmental process defined as the transition from childhood to adolescence and adult reproductive function. The first sign of female puberty is an acceleration of growth followed by the development of a palpable breast bud (thelarche). The median age of thelarche is 9.8 years. Although the sequence may be reversed, androgen dependent changes such as growth of axillary and pubic hair, body odor and acne (adrenarche) usually appears 2 years later. Onset of menstruation (menarche) is a late event (median 12.8 years), occurring after the peak of growth has passed.

Puberty is considered precocious (precocious puberty) if secondary sex characteristics occur before the age of 8 in girls and 9 years in boys. Increased growth is often the first change in precocious puberty, followed by breast development and growth of pubic hair. However, thelarche, adrenarche, and accelerated growth can occur simultaneously and although uncommon, menarche can be the first sign. Precocious puberty can be classified into central (gonadotropin-dependent) precocious puberty or peripheral (gonadotropin-independent) puberty. Both central and peripheral precocious puberty have been linked to exposure to exogenous estrogenic compounds.

Central precocious puberty is due to early maturation of the hypothalamic–pituitary–gonadal (HPG) axis. Majority of central precocious puberty cases are spontaneous or arise from an unknown cause, but some of these cases arise from organic lesions, environmental factors, and endocrine disrupting chemicals. Central precocious puberty is most commonly caused through idiopathic (unknown) reasons in girls, but there is an increased risk of these organic causes for central precocious puberty in boys.

Peripheral precocious puberty is independent of gonadotropin and thus does not activate the HPG axis. Peripheral precocious puberty in females most commonly shows through ovarian follicular cysts, which may cause vaginal bleeding. LH receptor activating mutations (familial testotoxicosis) are autosomal dominate diseases found in male children. These diseases are usually characterized by enlarged testis and can be an indication of peripheral precocious puberty in boys.

Age of onset of puberty is influenced by many factors such as genetics, nutritional status, ethnicity and environmental factors including socio-economic conditions and geographical location. A decline of age at onset of puberty from 17 years of age to 13 years of age has occurred over a period of 200 years until the middle of the 20th century. Trends toward earlier puberty have been attributed to improved public health and living conditions. A leading hypothesis for this change toward early puberty is improved nutrition resulting in rapid body growth, increased weight and fat deposition. However, recent studies have shown that chemical exposure to environmental estrogen disruptors the HPG axis and result in precocious puberty. In 1999, US Food and Drug Administration has recommended to not take estrogen in food of more than 0.43 ng/day for boys and 3.24 ng/day for females. Two recent epidemiologic studies in the United States (PROS and NMANES III) highlighted a recent unexpected advance in sexual maturation in girls. American, European and Asian studies suggest breast development in girls occurs at a much younger age than a few decades ago, irrespective of race and socioeconomic conditions. Environmental chemical exposure is one of the factors implicated in the recent downward trend of earlier sexual maturation.

Epidemiology

The prevalence of precocious puberty is difficult to determine as it is highly variable depending on the population from which the data has been collected. The Danish national registry estimated that roughly 20-23 per 10,000 (0.2%) of girls and 5 per 10,000 (0.05%) of boys suffer from a form of precocious puberty. An additional study conducted in Korea reported a where 55.9 per 100,000 girls and 1.7 per 100,000 boys indicated signs of central precocious puberty.

==== Thelarche in Puerto Rico ====
Since 1979, pediatric endocrinologists in Puerto Rico recognized an increase in number of patients with premature thelarche. The presence of phthalates were measured in the blood of 41 girls experiencing early onset breast development and matched set of controls. The average age of girls with premature thelarche was 31 months. They found high phthalate levels in the girls suffering from premature thelarche compared to the controls. Not all cases of premature thelarche in the study sample contained elevated levels of phthalate esters and there was concern whether artificial contamination from vinyl lab equipment and tubing invalidated the results, hence weakening the link between exposure and causation.

==== Tuscany precocious puberty cases ====
Dr. Massart and colleagues from the University of Pisa studied the increased prevalence of precocious puberty in a region of northwest Tuscany. This region of Italy is represented by a high density of navy yards and greenhouses where exposures to pesticides and mycoestrogens (estrogens produced by fungi) are common. Although unable to identify a definitive cause of the high rates of precocious puberty, the authors concluded environmental pesticides and herbicides may be implicated.

==== Dairy contamination ====
Animal feed was contaminated with several thousand pounds of polybrominated biphenyl in Michigan in 1973 resulting in high exposures of PBB in the population via milk and other products from contaminated cows. Perinatal exposure of children was estimated by measuring PBB in serum of mothers some years after exposure. Girls that had been exposed to high PBB levels through lactation had an earlier age of menarche and pubic hair development than girls who had less perinatal exposure. The study noted there no differences found in the timing of breast development among the cases and controls.

==== Fish contamination ====
The Great Lakes have been polluted with industrial wastes (mainly PCBs and DDT) since the beginning of the 20th century. These compounds have accumulated in birds and sports fish. A study was designed to assess the impact of consumption of contaminated fish on pregnant women and their children. Concentrations of maternal serum PCB and DDE and their daughters' age at menarche were reviewed. In multivariate analysis, DDE but not PCB was linked with a lowered age of menarche. Limitations of the study included indirect measurement of the exposure and self reporting of menarche.

==== Implications ====
Precocious puberty has numerous significant physical, psychological and social implications for young children. It has been associated with metabolic disorders (insulin resistance and diabetes), increased cardiometabolic risk (high blood pressure and cholesterol levels), obesity, increased cancer risk (breast and endometrial for girls and testicular for boys). Precocious puberty is linked with other gynecologic disorders such as endometriosis, adenomyosis, polycystic ovarian syndrome and infertility. Premature pubertal growth spurt and accelerated bone maturation will result in premature closure of distal epiphysis which causes reduced adult height and short stature. Precocious puberty can lead to psychosocial distress, a poor self-image, and poor self-esteem. Girls with secondary sex characteristics at such a young age are more likely to be bullied and suffer from sexual abuse. Studies indicate that girls who become sexually mature at earlier ages are also more likely to engage in risk-taking behaviors such as smoking, alcohol or drug use, and engaging in unprotected sex.

The current literature is inadequate to provide the information we need to assess the extent to which environmental chemicals contribute to precocious puberty. Gaps in our knowledge are the result of limitations in the designs of studies, small sample sizes, challenges to conducting exposure assessment and the few number of chemicals studied. Unfortunately exposure is inferred and not actually measured in available studies. The ability to detect the possible role of chemicals in altering pubertal development is confounded by many nutritional, genetic, and lifestyle factors capable of affecting puberty and the complex nature of the reproductive endocrine system. Other research challenges include shifts in exposure levels among populations over time and simultaneous exposures to multiple compounds. Overall the literature does not with certainty support the contention that environmental chemicals or dietary factors are having widespread effects on human sexual development. However data does not refute such a hypothesis either. Accelerated sexual development is plausible in individuals exposed to high concentration of estrogenic substances. There is a concerning steady increase in exposure to a wide variety of xenoestrogens in the industrial world. Further research is needed to assess the impact of these compounds on pubertal development.

=== In other animals ===
Non-human animal studies have shown that exposure to environmental contaminants with estrogenic activity can accelerate the onset of puberty. A potential mechanism has been described in rats exposed to DDT or beta-estradiol in which GnRH pulsatile secretion was found to be increased. Oral exposure of female rats to xenoestrogens has been shown to cause pseudo precocious puberty (early vaginal opening and early first estrus). A study of dioxin in immature female rats induced early follicular development and phthalates are known to decrease the anogenital distance in newborn rats. Although this article focuses on the effects of xenoestrogens and reproductive function in females, numerous animal studies also implicate environmental estrogens' and androgens' adverse effects on the male reproduction system. Administration of estrogens to developing male animals reduces testicular weight and decreases sperm production. The small phallus size of male alligators has been linked to contamination of their natural Florida habitat with DDT. Data from animal research is abundant demonstrating the adverse effects on reproduction of hormonally active compounds found in the environment.

== Common environmental estrogens ==
=== Atrazine ===
Atrazine is widely used as an herbicide to control broad-leaf weed species that grow in crops such as corn, sugarcane, hay and winter wheat. Atrazine is also applied to Christmas trees, residential lawns, golf courses, and other recreational areas. Atrazine is the second largest selling pesticide in the world and estimated to be the most heavily used herbicide in the United States. Atrazine has been implicated in interfering with the neuroendocrine system, blocking the release of gonadotropin-releasing hormone (GnRH) which in turn reduces luteinizing hormone (LH) and follicle stimulating hormone (FSH) levels.

=== BPA ===
BPA (bisphenol A) is the monomer used to manufacture polycarbonate plastic and epoxy resins used as a lining in most food and beverage cans. BPA global capacity is in excess of 6.4 billion pounds (2.9×10^{9} kg) per year and thus is one of the highest-volume chemicals produced worldwide. The ester bonds in the BPA-based polycarbonates could be subject to hydrolysis and leaching of BPA. But in the case of epoxypolymers formed from bisphenol A, it is not possible to release bisphenol A by such a reaction. It is also noteworthy that, of the bisphenols, bisphenol A is a weak xenoestrogen. Other compounds, such as bisphenol Z, have been shown to have stronger estrogenic effects in rats.

It has been suggested that biphenol A and other xenoestrogens might cause disease to humans and animals. BPA exposure is linked to dysfunctions in human systems including the immune, neuroendocrine, and excretory systems. The damage that results in these dysfunctions is via the mechanisms of enzyme interference, cellular oxidation, epigenetic changes, and the breaking of DNA strands.

Bisphenol S (BPS), an analog of BPA, has also been shown to alter estrogenic activity. One study demonstrated that when cultured rat pituitary cells were exposed to low levels of BPS, it altered the estrogen-estradiol signaling pathway and led to the inappropriate release of prolactin.

=== DDT ===
DDT (dichlorodiphenyltrichloroethane) was widely used in pesticides for agricultural purposes until it was banned in 1972 in the United States. DDT's hazardous effects on the environment include being linked to the production of fragile eggshells in birds and showed a 90% decline in the birth rates of alligators. Though it is banned in the United States, DDT continues to be used in many parts of the world for agricultural use, insect control, and to fight the spread of malaria.

DDT and its metabolites DDE and DDD are persistent in the environment and accumulate in fatty tissues. In vertebrates, DDT is unable to be broken down and remains within the organism. There is little risk of DDT causing an increase in health risk upon exposure in adulthood, but in key developmental periods prenatally and in adolescence, there has been evidence to suggest an increased risk of breast cancer.

=== Dioxin ===
Dioxin, a group of highly toxic chemicals are released during combustion processes, pesticide manufacturing and chlorine bleaching of wood pulp. Dioxin is discharged into waterways from pulp and paper mills. Consumption of animals fats is thought to be the primary pathway for human exposure. The connection between dioxin and dioxin-like compound (DLC) exposure and human disease is one not well established. Bioassays performed in animals does not show a strong connection between the two.

=== Endosulfan ===
Endosulfan is an insecticide used on numerous vegetables, fruits, cereal grains and trees. Endosulfan can be produced as a liquid concentrate, wettable powder or smoke tablet. Human exposure occurs through food consumption or ground and surface water contamination. Endosulfan exposure is known to cause seizures that are the result of hyper-stimulation of the central nervous system (CNS). Upon significant exposure and accumulation in the system, toxicity of the major organs such as the heart, liver and kidneys has been reported and can lead to death within hours.

=== Brominated flame retardants ===
Both PBBs and PBDEs belong to the same class of chemicals known as brominated flame retardants (BFRs). PBBs (polybrominated biphenyls) are chemicals added to plastics used in computer monitors, televisions, textiles and plastics foams to make them more difficult to burn. Manufacturing of PBBs in the United States stopped in 1976, however because they do not degrade easily. PBBs continue to be found in soil, water and air. PBDEs (polybrominated biphenyl ethers) behave similarly to PBBs in that they are also a flame retardant. PBDEs are not chemically bound to the items they are attached to, and thus can leech into the environment.

=== PCBs ===
PCBs (polychlorinated biphenyls) are man made organic chemicals known as chlorinated hydrocarbons. PCBs were manufactured primarily for use as insulating fluids and coolants given their chemical stability, low flammability and electrical insulating properties. PCBs were banned in 1979 but, like DDT, continue to persist in the environment. The effects of PCBs are not limited to the environment. There have been associations revealed between maternal PCB levels and conditions such as asthma, eczema, roseola, and upper respiratory infections.

=== Phthalates ===
Phthalates are plasticizers providing durability and flexibility to plastics such as polyvinyl chloride. High molecular weight phthalates are used in flooring, wall coverings and medical device such as intravenous bags and tubing. Low molecular weight phthalates are found in perfumes, lotions, cosmetics, varnishes, lacquers and coatings including timed releases in pharmaceuticals. Exposure to phthalates can have varying effects in humans depending on maturity. In adults, phthalate exposure has been linked to conditions like asthma, metabolic disorders like type II diabetes and insulin resistance, allergies, and asthma. In children, exposure to phthalates has a marked difference when compared to adults, having been associated with disrupted reproductive hormone levels and thyroid function.

=== Zeranol ===
Zeranol is currently used as an anabolic growth promoter for livestock in the US and Canada. It has been banned in the EU since 1985, but is still present as a contaminant in food through meat products that were exposed to it.

=== Miscellaneous ===
- alkylphenols (intermediate chemicals used in the manufacture of other chemicals)
- 4-Methylbenzylidene camphor (4-MBC) (sunscreen lotions)
- bisphenol S, BPS (an analog of BPA)
- butylated hydroxyanisole, BHA (food preservative)
- dichlorodiphenyldichloroethylene (one of the breakdown products of DDT)
- dieldrin (banned insecticide)
- DDT (banned insecticide)
- endosulfan (widely banned insecticide)
- erythrosine, FD&C Red No. 3 (E127)
- ethinylestradiol (combined oral contraceptive pill) (released into the environment as a xenoestrogen)
- heptachlor (restricted insecticide)
- lindane, hexachlorocyclohexane (restricted insecticide)
- metalloestrogens (a class of inorganic xenoestrogens)
- methoxychlor (banned insecticide)
- nonylphenol and derivatives (industrial surfactants; emulsifiers for emulsion polymerization; laboratory detergents; pesticides)
- pentachlorophenol (restricted general biocide and wood preservative)
- polychlorinated biphenyls, PCBs (banned; formerly used in electrical oils, lubricants, adhesives, paints)
- parabens (lotions)
- phthalates (plasticizers)
  - DEHP (plasticizer for PVC)
- Propyl gallate (used to protect oils and fats in products from carbonization)

== See also ==
- Diethylstilbestrol (obsolete pharmacological estrogen)
- Endocrine disruptor
- Environmental exogenous hormones
- Environmental impact of pharmaceuticals and personal care products
- Environmental xenobiotic
- Epidemiology and etiology of breast cancer
- List of breast carcinogenic substances
- Phytoestrogens
- SULT2B1
- Xenobiotic
- Xenoandrogen
