= Zearalenol =

Zearalenol may refer to:

- α-Zearalenol
- β-Zearalenol

== See also ==
- Zearalanol
- Zearalenone
- Zearalanone
