= C18H24O5 =

The molecular formula C_{18}H_{24}O_{5} (molar mass: 320.38 g/mol, exact mass: 320.1624 u) may refer to:

- Zearalanone (ZAN)
- α-Zearalenol
- β-Zearalenol
