= Zearalanol =

Zearalanol may refer to:

- α-Zearalanol (zeranol)
- β-Zearalanol (taleranol)

== See also ==
- Zearalenol
- Zearalanone
- Zearalenone
