= Resorcylic acid lactone =

Group of estrogenic compounds

Resorcylic acid lactones are a group of estrogenic compounds. They are lactones of resorcylic acid. Examples include the mycoestrogens (and synthetic analogues) zearalenone, zearalanone, zeranol (α-zearalanol), taleranol (β-zearalanol), α-zearalenol, and β-zearalenol. Resorcylic acid lactones (RALs) are fungal polyketides that consist of a β-resorcylic acid residue (2,4-dihydroxybenzoic acid) embedded in a macrolactone ring. RALs exhibit a broad range of biological activities, including anticancer activities.
