= Estrogen =

Primary female sex hormone

- Drug class
- Estradiol, the major estrogen sex hormone in humans and a widely used medication

Class identifiers
- Use: Contraception, menopause, hypogonadism, transgender women, prostate cancer, breast cancer, others
- ATC code: G03C
- Biological target: Estrogen receptors (ERα, ERβ, mERs (e.g., GPER, others))

External links
- MeSH: D004967

Legal status

Estrogen (US English (Note: see English spelling differences)) or oestrogen (Commonwealth English) is a category of sex hormones responsible for the development and regulation of the female reproductive system as well as secondary sex characteristics. There are three major endogenous estrogens that have estrogenic hormonal activity: estrone (E1), estradiol (E2), and estriol (E3). Estradiol, an estrane, is the most potent and prevalent. Another estrogen called estetrol (E4) is produced only during pregnancy.

Estrogens are synthesized in all vertebrates and some insects. In both sexes, circulating levels of estrogen are lower than those of androgens. Although estrogen levels are significantly lower in males than in females, they still play important physiological roles in males.

Like all steroid hormones, estrogens readily diffuse across the cell membrane. Once inside the cell, they bind to and activate estrogen receptors (ERs) which in turn modulate the expression of many genes. Additionally, estrogens bind to and activate rapid-signaling membrane estrogen receptors (mERs), such as GPER (GPR30).

In addition to their role as natural hormones, estrogens are used as medications, for instance in menopausal hormone therapy, hormonal birth control and feminizing hormone therapy for transgender women, intersex people, and nonbinary people.

Synthetic and natural estrogens have been found in the environment and are referred to as xenoestrogens. Estrogens are among the wide range of endocrine-disrupting compounds and can cause health issues and reproductive dysfunction in both wildlife and humans.

== Types and examples ==
Structures of major endogenous estrogens
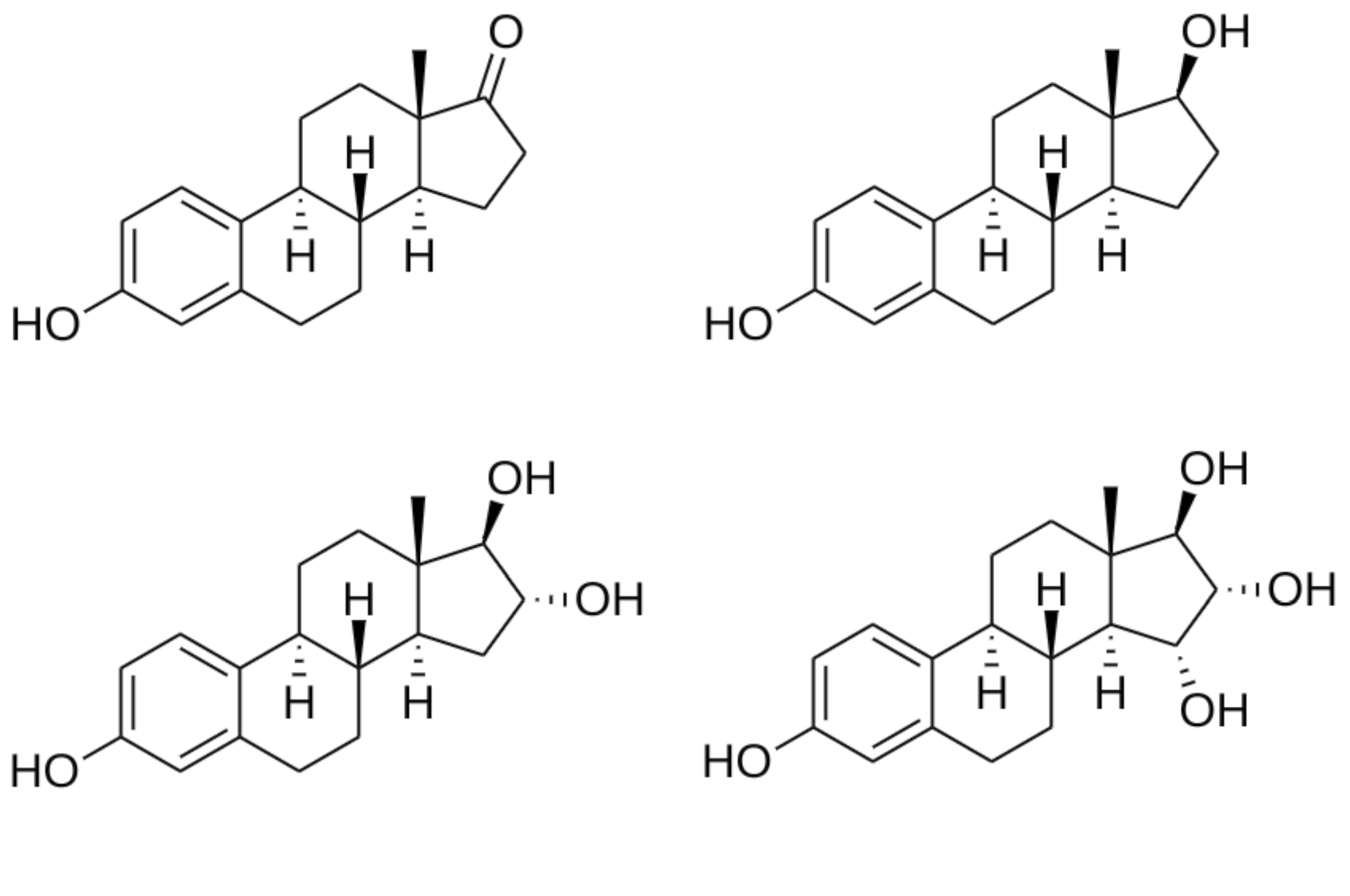
Note the hydroxyl (–OH) groups: estrone (E1) has one, estradiol (E2) has two, estriol (E3) has three, and estetrol (E4) has four.

The four major naturally occurring estrogens in women are estrone (E1), estradiol (E2), estriol (E3), and estetrol (E4). Estradiol (E2) is the predominant estrogen during reproductive years both in terms of absolute serum levels as well as in terms of estrogenic activity. During menopause, estrone is the predominant circulating estrogen and during pregnancy estriol is the predominant circulating estrogen in terms of serum levels. Given by subcutaneous injection in mice, estradiol is about 10-fold more potent than estrone and about 100-fold more potent than estriol. Thus, estradiol is the most important estrogen in non-pregnant females who are between the menarche and menopause stages of life. However, during pregnancy this role shifts to estriol, and in postmenopausal women estrone becomes the primary form of estrogen in the body. Another type of estrogen called estetrol (E4) is produced only during pregnancy. All of the different forms of estrogen are synthesized from androgens, specifically testosterone and androstenedione, by the enzyme aromatase.

Minor endogenous estrogens, the biosyntheses of which do not involve aromatase, include 27-hydroxycholesterol, dehydroepiandrosterone (DHEA), 7-oxo-DHEA, 7α-hydroxy-DHEA, 16α-hydroxy-DHEA, 7β-hydroxyepiandrosterone, androstenedione (A4), androstenediol (A5), 3α-androstanediol, and 3β-androstanediol. Some estrogen metabolites, such as the catechol estrogens 2-hydroxyestradiol, 2-hydroxyestrone, 4-hydroxyestradiol, and 4-hydroxyestrone, as well as 16α-hydroxyestrone, are also estrogens with varying degrees of activity. The biological importance of these minor estrogens is not entirely clear.

== Biological function ==
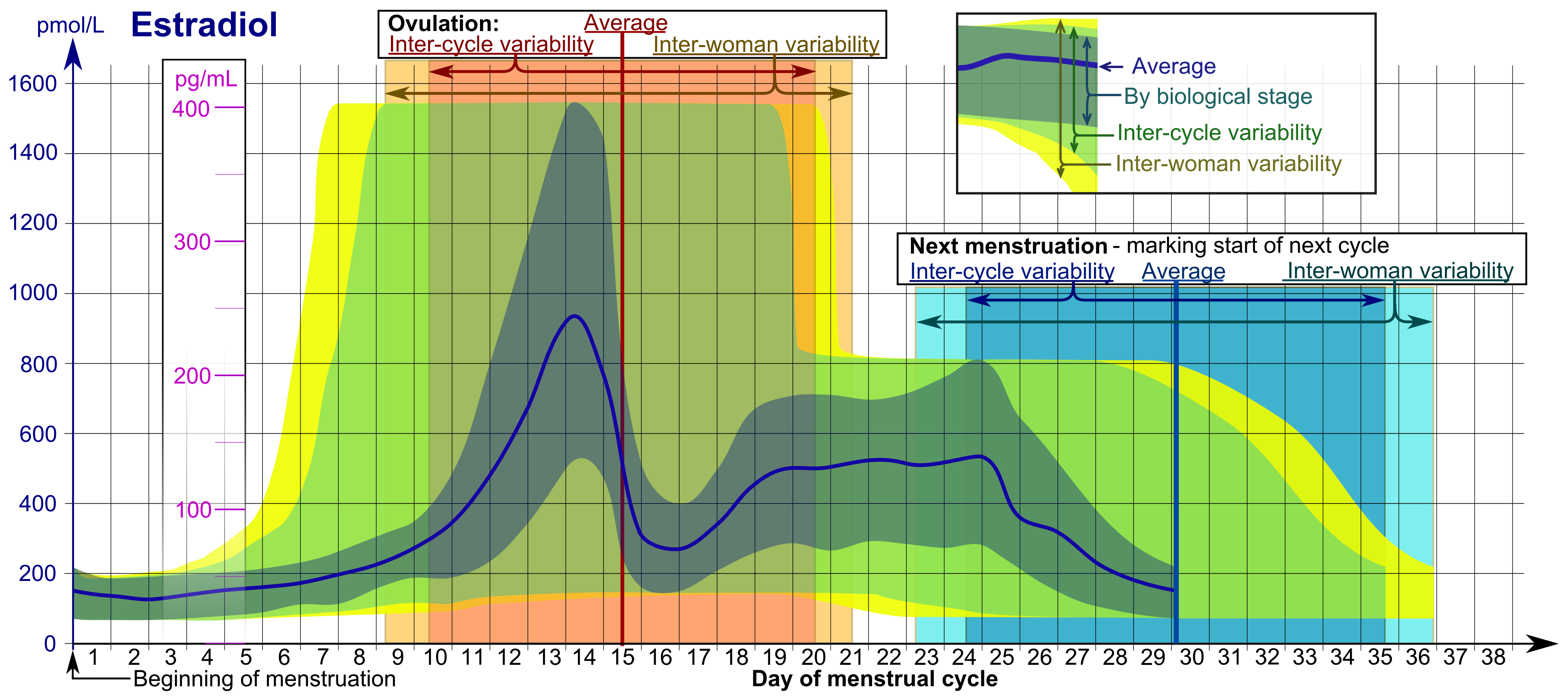
Reference ranges for the blood content of estradiol, the primary type of estrogen, during the menstrual cycle

The actions of estrogen are mediated by the estrogen receptor (ER), a dimeric nuclear protein that binds to DNA and controls gene expression. Like other steroid hormones, estrogen enters passively into the cell where it binds to and activates the estrogen receptor. The estrogen:ER complex binds to specific DNA sequences called a hormone response element to activate the transcription of target genes (in a study using an estrogen-dependent breast cancer cell line as model, 89 such genes were identified). Since estrogen enters all cells, its actions are dependent on the presence of the ER in the cell. The ER is expressed in specific tissues including the ovary, uterus and breast. The metabolic effects of estrogen in postmenopausal women have been linked to the genetic polymorphism of the ER.

While estrogens are present in both men and women, they are usually present at significantly higher levels in biological females of reproductive age. They promote the development of female secondary sexual characteristics, such as breasts, darkening and enlargement of nipples, and thickening of the endometrium and other aspects of regulating the menstrual cycle. In males, estrogen regulates certain functions of the reproductive system important to the maturation of sperm and may be necessary for a healthy libido.

Estrogens promote lung function in rodents by supporting alveoli and protect from acute kidney injury in females.

Affinities of estrogen receptor ligands for the ERα and ERβ
Ligand	Other names	Relative binding affinities (RBA, %)^{a}		Absolute binding affinities (K_{i}, nM)^{a}		Action
Ligand	Other names	ERα	ERβ	ERα	ERβ	Action
Estradiol	E2; 17β-Estradiol	100	100	0.115 (0.04–0.24)	0.15 (0.10–2.08)	Estrogen
Estrone	E1; 17-Ketoestradiol	16.39 (0.7–60)	6.5 (1.36–52)	0.445 (0.3–1.01)	1.75 (0.35–9.24)	Estrogen
Estriol	E3; 16α-OH-17β-E2	12.65 (4.03–56)	26 (14.0–44.6)	0.45 (0.35–1.4)	0.7 (0.63–0.7)	Estrogen
Estetrol	E4; 15α,16α-Di-OH-17β-E2	4.0	3.0	4.9	19	Estrogen
Alfatradiol	17α-Estradiol	20.5 (7–80.1)	8.195 (2–42)	0.2–0.52	0.43–1.2	Metabolite
16-Epiestriol	16β-Hydroxy-17β-estradiol	7.795 (4.94–63)	50	?	?	Metabolite
17-Epiestriol	16α-Hydroxy-17α-estradiol	55.45 (29–103)	79–80	?	?	Metabolite
16,17-Epiestriol	16β-Hydroxy-17α-estradiol	1.0	13	?	?	Metabolite
2-Hydroxyestradiol	2-OH-E2	22 (7–81)	11–35	2.5	1.3	Metabolite
2-Methoxyestradiol	2-MeO-E2	0.0027–2.0	1.0	?	?	Metabolite
4-Hydroxyestradiol	4-OH-E2	13 (8–70)	7–56	1.0	1.9	Metabolite
4-Methoxyestradiol	4-MeO-E2	2.0	1.0	?	?	Metabolite
2-Hydroxyestrone	2-OH-E1	2.0–4.0	0.2–0.4	?	?	Metabolite
2-Methoxyestrone	2-MeO-E1	<0.001–<1	<1	?	?	Metabolite
4-Hydroxyestrone	4-OH-E1	1.0–2.0	1.0	?	?	Metabolite
4-Methoxyestrone	4-MeO-E1	<1	<1	?	?	Metabolite
16α-Hydroxyestrone	16α-OH-E1; 17-Ketoestriol	2.0–6.5	35	?	?	Metabolite
2-Hydroxyestriol	2-OH-E3	2.0	1.0	?	?	Metabolite
4-Methoxyestriol	4-MeO-E3	1.0	1.0	?	?	Metabolite
Estradiol sulfate	E2S; Estradiol 3-sulfate	<1	<1	?	?	Metabolite
Estradiol disulfate	Estradiol 3,17β-disulfate	0.0004	?	?	?	Metabolite
Estradiol 3-glucuronide	E2-3G	0.0079	?	?	?	Metabolite
Estradiol 17β-glucuronide	E2-17G	0.0015	?	?	?	Metabolite
Estradiol 3-gluc. 17β-sulfate	E2-3G-17S	0.0001	?	?	?	Metabolite
Estrone sulfate	E1S; Estrone 3-sulfate	<1	<1	>10	>10	Metabolite
Estradiol benzoate	EB; Estradiol 3-benzoate	10	?	?	?	Estrogen
Estradiol 17β-benzoate	E2-17B	11.3	32.6	?	?	Estrogen
Estrone methyl ether	Estrone 3-methyl ether	0.145	?	?	?	Estrogen
ent-Estradiol	1-Estradiol	1.31–12.34	9.44–80.07	?	?	Estrogen
Equilin	7-Dehydroestrone	13 (4.0–28.9)	13.0–49	0.79	0.36	Estrogen
Equilenin	6,8-Didehydroestrone	2.0–15	7.0–20	0.64	0.62	Estrogen
17β-Dihydroequilin	7-Dehydro-17β-estradiol	7.9–113	7.9–108	0.09	0.17	Estrogen
17α-Dihydroequilin	7-Dehydro-17α-estradiol	18.6 (18–41)	14–32	0.24	0.57	Estrogen
17β-Dihydroequilenin	6,8-Didehydro-17β-estradiol	35–68	90–100	0.15	0.20	Estrogen
17α-Dihydroequilenin	6,8-Didehydro-17α-estradiol	20	49	0.50	0.37	Estrogen
Δ^{8}-Estradiol	8,9-Dehydro-17β-estradiol	68	72	0.15	0.25	Estrogen
Δ^{8}-Estrone	8,9-Dehydroestrone	19	32	0.52	0.57	Estrogen
Ethinylestradiol	EE; 17α-Ethynyl-17β-E2	120.9 (68.8–480)	44.4 (2.0–144)	0.02–0.05	0.29–0.81	Estrogen
Mestranol	EE 3-methyl ether	?	2.5	?	?	Estrogen
Moxestrol	RU-2858; 11β-Methoxy-EE	35–43	5–20	0.5	2.6	Estrogen
Methylestradiol	17α-Methyl-17β-estradiol	70	44	?	?	Estrogen
Diethylstilbestrol	DES; Stilbestrol	129.5 (89.1–468)	219.63 (61.2–295)	0.04	0.05	Estrogen
Hexestrol	Dihydrodiethylstilbestrol	153.6 (31–302)	60–234	0.06	0.06	Estrogen
Dienestrol	Dehydrostilbestrol	37 (20.4–223)	56–404	0.05	0.03	Estrogen
Benzestrol (B2)	–	114	?	?	?	Estrogen
Chlorotrianisene	TACE	1.74	?	15.30	?	Estrogen
Triphenylethylene	TPE	0.074	?	?	?	Estrogen
Triphenylbromoethylene	TPBE	2.69	?	?	?	Estrogen
Tamoxifen	ICI-46,474	3 (0.1–47)	3.33 (0.28–6)	3.4–9.69	2.5	SERM
Afimoxifene	4-Hydroxytamoxifen; 4-OHT	100.1 (1.7–257)	10 (0.98–339)	2.3 (0.1–3.61)	0.04–4.8	SERM
Toremifene	4-Chlorotamoxifen; 4-CT	?	?	7.14–20.3	15.4	SERM
Clomifene	MRL-41	25 (19.2–37.2)	12	0.9	1.2	SERM
Cyclofenil	F-6066; Sexovid	151–152	243	?	?	SERM
Nafoxidine	U-11,000A	30.9–44	16	0.3	0.8	SERM
Raloxifene	–	41.2 (7.8–69)	5.34 (0.54–16)	0.188–0.52	20.2	SERM
Arzoxifene	LY-353,381	?	?	0.179	?	SERM
Lasofoxifene	CP-336,156	10.2–166	19.0	0.229	?	SERM
Ormeloxifene	Centchroman	?	?	0.313	?	SERM
Levormeloxifene	6720-CDRI; NNC-460,020	1.55	1.88	?	?	SERM
Ospemifene	Deaminohydroxytoremifene	0.82–2.63	0.59–1.22	?	?	SERM
Bazedoxifene	–	?	?	0.053	?	SERM
Etacstil	GW-5638	4.30	11.5	?	?	SERM
ICI-164,384	–	63.5 (3.70–97.7)	166	0.2	0.08	Antiestrogen
Fulvestrant	ICI-182,780	43.5 (9.4–325)	21.65 (2.05–40.5)	0.42	1.3	Antiestrogen
Propylpyrazoletriol	PPT	49 (10.0–89.1)	0.12	0.40	92.8	ERα agonist
16α-LE2	16α-Lactone-17β-estradiol	14.6–57	0.089	0.27	131	ERα agonist
16α-Iodo-E2	16α-Iodo-17β-estradiol	30.2	2.30	?	?	ERα agonist
Methylpiperidinopyrazole	MPP	11	0.05	?	?	ERα antagonist
Diarylpropionitrile	DPN	0.12–0.25	6.6–18	32.4	1.7	ERβ agonist
8β-VE2	8β-Vinyl-17β-estradiol	0.35	22.0–83	12.9	0.50	ERβ agonist
Prinaberel	ERB-041; WAY-202,041	0.27	67–72	?	?	ERβ agonist
ERB-196	WAY-202,196	?	180	?	?	ERβ agonist
Erteberel	SERBA-1; LY-500,307	?	?	2.68	0.19	ERβ agonist
SERBA-2	–	?	?	14.5	1.54	ERβ agonist
Coumestrol	–	9.225 (0.0117–94)	64.125 (0.41–185)	0.14–80.0	0.07–27.0	Xenoestrogen
Genistein	–	0.445 (0.0012–16)	33.42 (0.86–87)	2.6–126	0.3–12.8	Xenoestrogen
Equol	–	0.2–0.287	0.85 (0.10–2.85)	?	?	Xenoestrogen
Daidzein	–	0.07 (0.0018–9.3)	0.7865 (0.04–17.1)	2.0	85.3	Xenoestrogen
Biochanin A	–	0.04 (0.022–0.15)	0.6225 (0.010–1.2)	174	8.9	Xenoestrogen
Kaempferol	–	0.07 (0.029–0.10)	2.2 (0.002–3.00)	?	?	Xenoestrogen
Naringenin	–	0.0054 (<0.001–0.01)	0.15 (0.11–0.33)	?	?	Xenoestrogen
8-Prenylnaringenin	8-PN	4.4	?	?	?	Xenoestrogen
Quercetin	–	<0.001–0.01	0.002–0.040	?	?	Xenoestrogen
Ipriflavone	–	<0.01	<0.01	?	?	Xenoestrogen
Miroestrol	–	0.39	?	?	?	Xenoestrogen
Deoxymiroestrol	–	2.0	?	?	?	Xenoestrogen
β-Sitosterol	–	<0.001–0.0875	<0.001–0.016	?	?	Xenoestrogen
Resveratrol	–	<0.001–0.0032	?	?	?	Xenoestrogen
α-Zearalenol	–	48 (13–52.5)	?	?	?	Xenoestrogen
β-Zearalenol	–	0.6 (0.032–13)	?	?	?	Xenoestrogen
Zeranol	α-Zearalanol	48–111	?	?	?	Xenoestrogen
Taleranol	β-Zearalanol	16 (13–17.8)	14	0.8	0.9	Xenoestrogen
Zearalenone	ZEN	7.68 (2.04–28)	9.45 (2.43–31.5)	?	?	Xenoestrogen
Zearalanone	ZAN	0.51	?	?	?	Xenoestrogen
Bisphenol A	BPA	0.0315 (0.008–1.0)	0.135 (0.002–4.23)	195	35	Xenoestrogen
Endosulfan	EDS	<0.001–<0.01	<0.01	?	?	Xenoestrogen
Kepone	Chlordecone	0.0069–0.2	?	?	?	Xenoestrogen
o,p'-DDT	–	0.0073–0.4	?	?	?	Xenoestrogen
p,p'-DDT	–	0.03	?	?	?	Xenoestrogen
Methoxychlor	p,p'-Dimethoxy-DDT	0.01 (<0.001–0.02)	0.01–0.13	?	?	Xenoestrogen
HPTE	Hydroxychlor; p,p'-OH-DDT	1.2–1.7	?	?	?	Xenoestrogen
Testosterone	T; 4-Androstenolone	<0.0001–<0.01	<0.002–0.040	>5000	>5000	Androgen
Dihydrotestosterone	DHT; 5α-Androstanolone	0.01 (<0.001–0.05)	0.0059–0.17	221–>5000	73–1688	Androgen
Nandrolone	19-Nortestosterone; 19-NT	0.01	0.23	765	53	Androgen
Dehydroepiandrosterone	DHEA; Prasterone	0.038 (<0.001–0.04)	0.019–0.07	245–1053	163–515	Androgen
5-Androstenediol	A5; Androstenediol	6	17	3.6	0.9	Androgen
4-Androstenediol	–	0.5	0.6	23	19	Androgen
4-Androstenedione	A4; Androstenedione	<0.01	<0.01	>10000	>10000	Androgen
3α-Androstanediol	3α-Adiol	0.07	0.3	260	48	Androgen
3β-Androstanediol	3β-Adiol	3	7	6	2	Androgen
Androstanedione	5α-Androstanedione	<0.01	<0.01	>10000	>10000	Androgen
Etiocholanedione	5β-Androstanedione	<0.01	<0.01	>10000	>10000	Androgen
Methyltestosterone	17α-Methyltestosterone	<0.0001	?	?	?	Androgen
Ethinyl-3α-androstanediol	17α-Ethynyl-3α-adiol	4.0	<0.07	?	?	Estrogen
Ethinyl-3β-androstanediol	17α-Ethynyl-3β-adiol	50	5.6	?	?	Estrogen
Progesterone	P4; 4-Pregnenedione	<0.001–0.6	<0.001–0.010	?	?	Progestogen
Norethisterone	NET; 17α-Ethynyl-19-NT	0.085 (0.0015–<0.1)	0.1 (0.01–0.3)	152	1084	Progestogen
Norethynodrel	5(10)-Norethisterone	0.5 (0.3–0.7)	<0.1–0.22	14	53	Progestogen
Tibolone	7α-Methylnorethynodrel	0.5 (0.45–2.0)	0.2–0.076	?	?	Progestogen
Δ^{4}-Tibolone	7α-Methylnorethisterone	0.069–<0.1	0.027–<0.1	?	?	Progestogen
3α-Hydroxytibolone	–	2.5 (1.06–5.0)	0.6–0.8	?	?	Progestogen
3β-Hydroxytibolone	–	1.6 (0.75–1.9)	0.070–0.1	?	?	Progestogen
Footnotes: ^{a} = (1) Binding affinity values are of the format "median (range)" (# (#–#)), "range" (#–#), or "value" (#) depending on the values available. The full sets of values within the ranges can be found in the Wiki code. (2) Binding affinities were determined via displacement studies in a variety of in-vitro systems with labeled estradiol and human ERα and ERβ proteins (except the ERβ values from Kuiper et al. (1997), which are rat ERβ). Sources: See template page.

Relative affinities of estrogens for steroid hormone receptors and blood proteins
Estrogen	Relative binding affinities (%)						
Estrogen	ER	AR	PR	GR	MR	SHBG	CBG
Estradiol	100	7.9	2.6	0.6	0.13	8.7–12	<0.1
Estradiol benzoate	?	?	?	?	?	<0.1–0.16	<0.1
Estradiol valerate	2	?	?	?	?	?	?
Estrone	11–35	<1	<1	<1	<1	2.7	<0.1
Estrone sulfate	2	2	?	?	?	?	?
Estriol	10–15	<1	<1	<1	<1	<0.1	<0.1
Equilin	40	?	?	?	?	?	0
Alfatradiol	15	<1	<1	<1	<1	?	?
Epiestriol	20	<1	<1	<1	<1	?	?
Ethinylestradiol	100–112	1–3	15–25	1–3	<1	0.18	<0.1
Mestranol	1	?	?	?	?	<0.1	<0.1
Methylestradiol	67	1–3	3–25	1–3	<1	?	?
Moxestrol	12	<0.1	0.8	3.2	<0.1	<0.2	<0.1
Diethylstilbestrol	?	?	?	?	?	<0.1	<0.1
Notes: Reference ligands (100%) were progesterone for the PR, testosterone for the AR, estradiol for the ER, dexamethasone for the GR, aldosterone for the MR, dihydrotestosterone for SHBG, and cortisol for CBG. Sources: See template.

Affinities and estrogenic potencies of estrogen esters and ethers at the estrogen receptors
Estrogen	Other names	RBA (%)^{a}	REP (%)^{b}	
Estrogen	Other names	ER	ERα	ERβ
Estradiol	E2	100	100	100
Estradiol 3-sulfate	E2S; E2-3S	?	0.02	0.04
Estradiol 3-glucuronide	E2-3G	?	0.02	0.09
Estradiol 17β-glucuronide	E2-17G	?	0.002	0.0002
Estradiol benzoate	EB; Estradiol 3-benzoate	10	1.1	0.52
Estradiol 17β-acetate	E2-17A	31–45	24	?
Estradiol diacetate	EDA; Estradiol 3,17β-diacetate	?	0.79	?
Estradiol propionate	EP; Estradiol 17β-propionate	19–26	2.6	?
Estradiol valerate	EV; Estradiol 17β-valerate	2–11	0.04–21	?
Estradiol cypionate	EC; Estradiol 17β-cypionate	?^{c}	4.0	?
Estradiol palmitate	Estradiol 17β-palmitate	0	?	?
Estradiol stearate	Estradiol 17β-stearate	0	?	?
Estrone	E1; 17-Ketoestradiol	11	5.3–38	14
Estrone sulfate	E1S; Estrone 3-sulfate	2	0.004	0.002
Estrone glucuronide	E1G; Estrone 3-glucuronide	?	<0.001	0.0006
Ethinylestradiol	EE; 17α-Ethynylestradiol	100	17–150	129
Mestranol	EE 3-methyl ether	1	1.3–8.2	0.16
Quinestrol	EE 3-cyclopentyl ether	?	0.37	?
Footnotes: ^{a} = Relative binding affinities (RBAs) were determined via in-vitro displacement of labeled estradiol from estrogen receptors (ERs) generally of rodent uterine cytosol. Estrogen esters are variably hydrolyzed into estrogens in these systems (shorter ester chain length -> greater rate of hydrolysis) and the ER RBAs of the esters decrease strongly when hydrolysis is prevented. ^{b} = Relative estrogenic potencies (REPs) were calculated from half-maximal effective concentrations (EC_{50}) that were determined via in-vitro β‐galactosidase (β-gal) and green fluorescent protein (GFP) production assays in yeast expressing human ERα and human ERβ. Both mammalian cells and yeast have the capacity to hydrolyze estrogen esters. ^{c} = The affinities of estradiol cypionate for the ERs are similar to those of estradiol valerate and estradiol benzoate (figure). Sources: See template page.

Selected biological properties of endogenous estrogens in rats
Estrogen	ER RBA (%)	Uterine weight (%)	Uterotrophy	LH levels (%)	SHBG RBA (%)
Control	–	100	–	100	–
Estradiol (E2)	100	506 ± 20	+++	12–19	100
Estrone (E1)	11 ± 8	490 ± 22	+++	?	20
Estriol (E3)	10 ± 4	468 ± 30	+++	8–18	3
Estetrol (E4)	0.5 ± 0.2	?	Inactive	?	1
17α-Estradiol	4.2 ± 0.8	?	?	?	?
2-Hydroxyestradiol	24 ± 7	285 ± 8	+^{b}	31–61	28
2-Methoxyestradiol	0.05 ± 0.04	101	Inactive	?	130
4-Hydroxyestradiol	45 ± 12	?	?	?	?
4-Methoxyestradiol	1.3 ± 0.2	260	++	?	9
4-Fluoroestradiol^{a}	180 ± 43	?	+++	?	?
2-Hydroxyestrone	1.9 ± 0.8	130 ± 9	Inactive	110–142	8
2-Methoxyestrone	0.01 ± 0.00	103 ± 7	Inactive	95–100	120
4-Hydroxyestrone	11 ± 4	351	++	21–50	35
4-Methoxyestrone	0.13 ± 0.04	338	++	65–92	12
16α-Hydroxyestrone	2.8 ± 1.0	552 ± 42	+++	7–24	<0.5
2-Hydroxyestriol	0.9 ± 0.3	302	+^{b}	?	?
2-Methoxyestriol	0.01 ± 0.00	?	Inactive	?	4
Notes: Values are mean ± SD or range. ER RBA = Relative binding affinity to estrogen receptors of rat uterine cytosol. Uterine weight = Percentage change in uterine wet weight of ovariectomized rats after 72 hours with continuous administration of 1 μg/hour via subcutaneously implanted osmotic pumps. LH levels = Luteinizing hormone levels relative to baseline of ovariectomized rats after 24 to 72 hours of continuous administration via subcutaneous implant. Footnotes: ^{a} = Synthetic (i.e., not endogenous). ^{b} = Atypical uterotrophic effect which plateaus within 48 hours (estradiol's uterotrophy continues linearly up to 72 hours). Sources:

=== Female pubertal development ===
Estrogens are responsible for the development of female secondary sexual characteristics during puberty. This includes breast development, widening of the hips, and female fat distribution. Conversely, androgens are responsible for pubic and body hair growth, as well as acne and axillary odor.

==== Breast development ====
Estrogen, in conjunction with growth hormone (GH) and its secretory product insulin-like growth factor 1 (IGF-1), is critical in mediating breast development during puberty, as well as breast maturation during pregnancy in preparation of lactation and breastfeeding. Estrogen is primarily and directly responsible for inducing the ductal component of breast development, as well as for causing fat deposition and connective tissue growth. It is also indirectly involved in the lobuloalveolar component, by increasing progesterone receptor expression in the breasts and by inducing the secretion of prolactin. Allowed for by estrogen, progesterone and prolactin work together to complete lobuloalveolar development during pregnancy.

Androgens such as testosterone powerfully oppose estrogen action in the breasts, such as by reducing estrogen receptor expression in them.

=== Female reproductive system ===
Estrogens are responsible for maturation and maintenance of the vagina and uterus. Estradiol is involved in ovarian function and regulates the ovarian cycle such as maturation of ovarian follicles. A surge in estrogen levels induces the release of the luteinizing hormone, which then triggers ovulation by releasing the egg from the Graafian follicle in the ovary. In addition, estrogens play an important role in regulation of gonadotropin secretion. For these reasons, estrogens are required for female fertility.

Estradiol, together with progesterone, promotes and maintains the endometrium in preparation for implantation of fertilized egg and maintains of uterus function during gestation period. It also upregulates oxytocin receptors in the myometrium.

=== Metabolism ===
Estrogens are heavily involved in energy homeostasis and metabolism. Estrogen deficiencies are linked to metabolic disorders and obesity. Men under abnormal circumstances, such as a high-fat diet are more susceptible to such conditions. Estradiol has a stronger anti-obesity effect than testosterone.

Estrogens promote gynoid fat distribution; increased fat storage or estrogenic fat in body parts such as the breasts, buttocks, and legs. They decrease abdominal and visceral fat (androgenic obesity).

Estradiol inhibits ferroptosis, a type of programmed cell death.

=== Neuroprotection and DNA repair ===
Estrogen regulated DNA repair mechanisms in the brain have neuroprotective effects. Estrogen regulates the transcription of DNA base excision repair genes as well as the translocation of the base excision repair enzymes between different subcellular compartments.

Estrogen provides neuroprotection by modulating the endocannabinoid system activity, primarily through the regulation of fatty acid amide hydrolase (FAAH) enzyme expression and the endocannabinoid receptor Cβ1 levels. The protective effects appears to work through a fine-tuning mechanism where by estrogen both suppresses excessive endocannabinoid signaling at the Cβ1receptor (which can be neurotoxic under stress) while simultaneously maintaining physiological endocannabinoid tine needed for normal neural function.

=== Brain and behavior ===
==== Sex drive ====
Estrogens are involved in libido (sex drive) in both women and men. In women, estrogen levels are elevated during the periovulatory period of the menstrual cycle, which is associated with increased sexual motivation.

Libido is dependent on androgen levels only in the presence of estrogens. Without estrogens, free testosterone level actually decreases sexual desire. Sexual desire in women who have hypoactive sexual desire disorder can be restored by administration of estrogen (using oral contraceptive).

Estrogens are required for female mammals to engage in lordosis behavior during estrus. This behavior is required for sexual receptivity in these mammals and is regulated by the ventromedial nucleus of the hypothalamus.

==== Cognition ====
Verbal memory scores are frequently used as one measure of higher level cognition. These scores vary in direct proportion to estrogen levels throughout the menstrual cycle, pregnancy, and menopause. Furthermore, estrogens when administered shortly after natural or surgical menopause prevents decreases in verbal memory. In contrast, estrogens have little effect on verbal memory if first administered years after menopause. Estrogens also have positive influences on other measures of cognitive function. However the effect of estrogens on cognition is not uniformly favorable and is dependent on the timing of the dose and the type of cognitive skill being measured.

The protective effects of estrogens on cognition may be mediated by estrogen's anti-inflammatory effects in the brain. Studies have also shown that the Met allele gene and level of estrogen mediates the efficiency of prefrontal cortex dependent working memory tasks. Researchers have urged for further research to illuminate the role of estrogen and its potential for improvement on cognitive function.

==== Mental health ====
Estrogen is considered to play a significant role in women's mental health. Sudden estrogen withdrawal, fluctuating estrogen, and periods of sustained low estrogen levels correlate with a significant lowering of mood. Clinical recovery from postpartum, perimenopause, and postmenopause depression has been shown to be effective after levels of estrogen were stabilized and/or restored. Menstrual exacerbation (including menstrual psychosis) is typically triggered by low estrogen levels, and is often mistaken for premenstrual dysphoric disorder.

Compulsions in male lab mice, such as those in obsessive-compulsive disorder (OCD), may be caused by low estrogen levels. When estrogen levels were raised through the increased activity of the enzyme aromatase in male lab mice, OCD rituals were dramatically decreased. Hypothalamic protein levels in the gene COMT are enhanced by increasing estrogen levels which are believed to return mice that displayed OCD rituals to normal activity. Aromatase deficiency is ultimately suspected which is involved in the synthesis of estrogen in humans and has therapeutic implications in humans having obsessive-compulsive disorder.

Local application of estrogen in the rat hippocampus has been shown to inhibit the re-uptake of serotonin. Contrarily, local application of estrogen has been shown to block the ability of fluvoxamine to slow serotonin clearance, suggesting that the same pathways which are involved in SSRI efficacy may also be affected by components of local estrogen signaling pathways.

==== Parenthood ====
Studies have also found that fathers had lower levels of cortisol and testosterone but higher levels of estrogen (estradiol) than did non-fathers.

==== Binge eating ====
Estrogen may play a role in suppressing binge eating. Hormone replacement therapy using estrogen may be a possible treatment for binge eating behaviors in females. Estrogen replacement has been shown to suppress binge eating behaviors in female mice. The mechanism by which estrogen replacement inhibits binge-like eating involves the replacement of serotonin (5-HT) neurons. Women exhibiting binge eating behaviors are found to have increased brain uptake of neuron 5-HT, and therefore less of the neurotransmitter serotonin in the cerebrospinal fluid. Estrogen works to activate 5-HT neurons, leading to suppression of binge like eating behaviors.

It is also suggested that there is an interaction between hormone levels and eating at different points in the female menstrual cycle. Research has predicted increased emotional eating during hormonal flux, which is characterized by high progesterone and estradiol levels that occur during the mid-luteal phase. It is hypothesized that these changes occur due to brain changes across the menstrual cycle that are likely a genomic effect of hormones. These effects produce menstrual cycle changes, which result in hormone release leading to behavioral changes, notably binge and emotional eating. These occur especially prominently among women who are genetically vulnerable to binge eating phenotypes.

Binge eating is associated with decreased estradiol and increased progesterone. Klump et al. Progesterone may moderate the effects of low estradiol (such as during dysregulated eating behavior), but that this may only be true in women who have had clinically diagnosed binge episodes (BEs). Dysregulated eating is more strongly associated with such ovarian hormones in women with BEs than in women without BEs.

The implantation of 17β-estradiol pellets in ovariectomized mice significantly reduced binge eating behaviors and injections of GLP-1 in ovariectomized mice decreased binge-eating behaviors.

The associations between binge eating, menstrual-cycle phase and ovarian hormones correlated.

==== Masculinization in rodents ====
In rodents, estrogens (which are locally aromatized from androgens in the brain) play an important role in psychosexual differentiation, for example, by masculinizing territorial behavior; the same is not true in humans. In humans, the masculinizing effects of prenatal androgens on behavior (and other tissues, with the possible exception of effects on bone) appear to act exclusively through the androgen receptor. Consequently, the utility of rodent models for studying human psychosexual differentiation has been questioned.

=== Musculoskeletal system ===
Estrogens increase muscle mass and strength, as well as the speed of muscle regeneration. They protect against damage to muscles and increase their sensitivity to exercise. In mice, estrogen supplementation has been shown to restore the proportion of type IIX muscle fibers to over 40% following an ovariectomy. Estrogens promote stronger collagen synthesis, increasing the collagen content of connective tissues, tendons, and ligaments. This decreases the stiffness of tendons and ligaments, especially during menstruation. Women have a lower predisposition to muscle strains, but soft ligaments are more prone to injuries. ACL tears are two to eight times more common among women than men.

Estrogens are responsible for both the pubertal growth spurt, which causes an acceleration in linear growth, and epiphyseal closure, which limits height and limb length, in both females and males. In addition, estrogens are responsible for bone maturation and maintenance of bone mineral density throughout life. They reduce bone resorption and promote bone formation. Due to hypoestrogenism, the risk of osteoporosis increases during menopause.

=== Cardiovascular system ===
Women are less impacted by heart disease due to vasculo-protective action of estrogen which helps in preventing atherosclerosis. It also helps in maintaining the delicate balance between fighting infections and protecting arteries from damage thus lowering the risk of cardiovascular disease. During pregnancy, high levels of estrogens increase coagulation and the risk of venous thromboembolism. Estrogens have been shown to upregulate the peptide hormone adropin, increase platelet adhesiveness, and increase the circulating level of coagulation factors 2, 7, 9, and 10, as well as plasminogens. They also decrease antithrombin III, which suppresses parts of the coagulation system.

Absolute and relative incidence of venous thromboembolism (VTE) during pregnancy and the postpartum period
Absolute incidence of first VTE per 10,000 person–years during pregnancy and the postpartum period
	Swedish data A		Swedish data B		English data		Danish data	
Time period	N	Rate (95% CI)	N	Rate (95% CI)	NФВяы	Rate (95% CI)	N	Rate (95% CI)
Outside pregnancy	1105	4.2 (4.0–4.4)	1015	3.8 (?)	1480	3.2 (3.0–3.3)	2895	3.6 (3.4–3.7)
Antepartum	995	20.5 (19.2–21.8)	690	14.2 (13.2–15.3)	156	9.9 (8.5–11.6)	491	10.7 (9.7–11.6)
Trimester 1	207	13.6 (11.8–15.5)	172	11.3 (9.7–13.1)	23	4.6 (3.1–7.0)	61	4.1 (3.2–5.2)
Trimester 2	275	17.4 (15.4–19.6)	178	11.2 (9.7–13.0)	30	5.8 (4.1–8.3)	75	5.7 (4.6–7.2)
Trimester 3	513	29.2 (26.8–31.9)	340	19.4 (17.4–21.6)	103	18.2 (15.0–22.1)	355	19.7 (17.7–21.9)
Around delivery	115	154.6 (128.8–185.6)	79	106.1 (85.1–132.3)	34	142.8 (102.0–199.8)	–	
Postpartum	649	42.3 (39.2–45.7)	509	33.1 (30.4–36.1)	135	27.4 (23.1–32.4)	218	17.5 (15.3–20.0)
Early postpartum	584	75.4 (69.6–81.8)	460	59.3 (54.1–65.0)	177	46.8 (39.1–56.1)	199	30.4 (26.4–35.0)
Late postpartum	65	8.5 (7.0–10.9)	49	6.4 (4.9–8.5)	18	7.3 (4.6–11.6)	319	3.2 (1.9–5.0)
Incidence rate ratios (IRRs) of first VTE during pregnancy and the postpartum period
	Swedish data A		Swedish data B		English data		Danish data	
Time period	IRR* (95% CI)		IRR* (95% CI)		IRR (95% CI)†		IRR (95% CI)†	
Outside pregnancy	Reference (i.e., 1.00)							
Antepartum	5.08 (4.66–5.54)		3.80 (3.44–4.19)		3.10 (2.63–3.66)		2.95 (2.68–3.25)	
Trimester 1	3.42 (2.95–3.98)		3.04 (2.58–3.56)		1.46 (0.96–2.20)		1.12 (0.86–1.45)	
Trimester 2	4.31 (3.78–4.93)		3.01 (2.56–3.53)		1.82 (1.27–2.62)		1.58 (1.24–1.99)	
Trimester 3	7.14 (6.43–7.94)		5.12 (4.53–5.80)		5.69 (4.66–6.95)		5.48 (4.89–6.12)	
Around delivery	37.5 (30.9–44.45)		27.97 (22.24–35.17)		44.5 (31.68–62.54)		–	
Postpartum	10.21 (9.27–11.25)		8.72 (7.83–9.70)		8.54 (7.16–10.19)		4.85 (4.21–5.57)	
Early postpartum	19.27 (16.53–20.21)		15.62 (14.00–17.45)		14.61 (12.10–17.67)		8.44 (7.27–9.75)	
Late postpartum	2.06 (1.60–2.64)		1.69 (1.26–2.25)		2.29 (1.44–3.65)		0.89 (0.53–1.39)	
Notes: Swedish data A = Using any code for VTE regardless of confirmation. Swedish data B = Using only algorithm-confirmed VTE. Early postpartum = First 6 weeks after delivery. Late postpartum = More than 6 weeks after delivery. * = Adjusted for age and calendar year. † = Unadjusted ratio calculated based on the data provided. Source:

=== Skin ===
Estrogens are known to cause darkening of skin, especially in the face and areolae. Pale skinned women will develop browner and yellower skin during pregnancy, known as the "mask of pregnancy". Estrogens may explain why women generally have darker skin and eyes than men, as well as a lower risk of skin cancer.

=== Immune system ===
The effect of estrogen on the immune system is in general described as Th2 favoring, rather than suppressive, as is the case of the effect of male sex hormone – testosterone. Indeed, women respond better to vaccines, infections and are generally less likely to develop cancer, the tradeoff of this is that they are more likely to develop an autoimmune disease. The Th2 shift manifests itself in a decrease of cellular immunity and increase in humoral immunity (antibody production) shifts it from cellular to humoral by downregulating cell-mediated immunity and enhancing Th2 immune response by stimulating IL-4 production and Th2 differentiation. Type 1 and type 17 immune responses are downregulated, likely to be at least partially due to IL-4, which inhibits Th1. Effect of estrogen on different immune cells' cell types is in line with its Th2 bias. Activity of basophils, eosinophils, M2 macrophages and is enhanced, whereas activity of NK cells is downregulated. Conventional dendritic cells are biased towards Th2 under the influence of estrogen, whereas plasmacytoid dendritic cells, key players in antiviral defence, have increased IFN-g secretion. Estrogen also influences B cells by increasing their survival, proliferation, differentiation and function, which corresponds with higher antibody and B cell count generally detected in women.

On a molecular level estrogen induces the above-mentioned effects on cell via acting on intracellular receptors termed ER α and ER β, which upon ligation form either homo or heterodimers. The genetic and nongenetic targets of the receptors differ between homo and heterodimers. Ligation of these receptors allows them to translocate to the nucleus and act as transcription factors either by binding estrogen response elements (ERE) on DNA or binding DNA together with other transcriptional factors e.g. Nf-kB or AP-1, both of which result in RNA polymerase recruitment and further chromatin remodelation. A non-transcriptional response to estrogen stimulation was also documented (termed membrane-initiated steroid signaling, MISS). This pathway stimulates the ERK and PI3K/AKT pathways, which are known to increase cellular proliferation and affect chromatin remodelation.

=== Associated conditions ===
Researchers have implicated estrogens in various estrogen-dependent conditions, such as ER-positive breast cancer, as well as a number of genetic conditions involving estrogen signaling or metabolism, such as estrogen insensitivity syndrome, aromatase deficiency, and aromatase excess syndrome.

Estrogens promote salt and water retention, which can lead to facial swelling and edema. High estrogen can amplify stress-hormone responses in stressful situations.

== Biochemistry ==
=== Biosynthesis ===
Steroidogenesis, showing estrogens at bottom right as in pink triangle

Estrogens, in females, are produced primarily by the ovaries, and during pregnancy, the placenta. Follicle-stimulating hormone (FSH) stimulates the ovarian production of estrogens by the granulosa cells of the ovarian follicles and corpora lutea. Some estrogens are also produced in smaller amounts by other tissues such as the liver, pancreas, bone, adrenal glands, skin, brain, adipose tissue, and the breasts. These secondary sources of estrogens are especially important in postmenopausal women. The pathway of estrogen biosynthesis in extragonadal tissues is different. These tissues are not able to synthesize C19 steroids, and therefore depend on C19 supplies from other tissues and the level of aromatase.

In females, synthesis of estrogens starts in theca interna cells in the ovary, by the synthesis of androstenedione from cholesterol. Androstenedione is a substance of weak androgenic activity which serves predominantly as a precursor for more potent androgens such as testosterone as well as estrogen. This compound crosses the basal membrane into the surrounding granulosa cells, where it is converted either immediately into estrone, or into testosterone and then estradiol in an additional step. The conversion of androstenedione to testosterone is catalyzed by 17β-hydroxysteroid dehydrogenase (17β-HSD), whereas the conversion of androstenedione and testosterone into estrone and estradiol, respectively is catalyzed by aromatase, enzymes which are both expressed in granulosa cells. In contrast, granulosa cells lack 17α-hydroxylase and 17,20-lyase, whereas theca cells express these enzymes and 17β-HSD but lack aromatase. Hence, both granulosa and theca cells are essential for the production of estrogen in the ovaries.

Estrogen levels vary through the menstrual cycle, with levels highest near the end of the follicular phase just before ovulation.

Note that in males, estrogen is also produced by the Sertoli cells when FSH binds to their FSH receptors.

Production rates, secretion rates, clearance rates, and blood levels of major sex hormones
Sex	Sex hormone	Reproductive phase	Blood production rate	Gonadal secretion rate	Metabolic clearance rate	Reference range (serum levels)	
Sex	Sex hormone	Reproductive phase	Blood production rate	Gonadal secretion rate	Metabolic clearance rate	Molar concentration	Mass concentration
Men	Androstenedione	–	2.8 mg/day	1.6 mg/day	2200 L/day	2.8–7.3 nmol/L	80–210 ng/dL
Men	Testosterone	–	6.5 mg/day	6.2 mg/day	950 L/day	6.9–34.7 nmol/L	200–1000 ng/dL
Men	Estrone	–	150 μg/day	110 μg/day	2050 L/day	37–250 pmol/L	10–70 pg/mL
Men	Estradiol	–	60 μg/day	50 μg/day	1600 L/day	<37–210 pmol/L	10–57 pg/mL
Men	Estrone sulfate	–	80 μg/day	Insignificant	167 L/day	600–2500 pmol/L	200–900 pg/mL
Women	Androstenedione	–	3.2 mg/day	2.8 mg/day	2000 L/day	3.1–12.2 nmol/L	89–350 ng/dL
Women	Testosterone	–	190 μg/day	60 μg/day	500 L/day	0.7–2.8 nmol/L	20–81 ng/dL
Women	Estrone	Follicular phase	110 μg/day	80 μg/day	2200 L/day	110–400 pmol/L	30–110 pg/mL
Women	Estrone	Luteal phase	260 μg/day	150 μg/day	2200 L/day	310–660 pmol/L	80–180 pg/mL
Women	Estrone	Postmenopause	40 μg/day	Insignificant	1610 L/day	22–230 pmol/L	6–60 pg/mL
Women	Estradiol	Follicular phase	90 μg/day	80 μg/day	1200 L/day	<37–360 pmol/L	10–98 pg/mL
Women	Estradiol	Luteal phase	250 μg/day	240 μg/day	1200 L/day	699–1250 pmol/L	190–341 pg/mL
Women	Estradiol	Postmenopause	6 μg/day	Insignificant	910 L/day	<37–140 pmol/L	10–38 pg/mL
Women	Estrone sulfate	Follicular phase	100 μg/day	Insignificant	146 L/day	700–3600 pmol/L	250–1300 pg/mL
Women	Estrone sulfate	Luteal phase	180 μg/day	Insignificant	146 L/day	1100–7300 pmol/L	400–2600 pg/mL
Women	Progesterone	Follicular phase	2 mg/day	1.7 mg/day	2100 L/day	0.3–3 nmol/L	0.1–0.9 ng/mL
Women	Progesterone	Luteal phase	25 mg/day	24 mg/day	2100 L/day	19–45 nmol/L	6–14 ng/mL
Notes and sources Notes: "The concentration of a steroid in the circulation is determined by the rate at which it is secreted from glands, the rate of metabolism of precursor or prehormones into the steroid, and the rate at which it is extracted by tissues and metabolized. The secretion rate of a steroid refers to the total secretion of the compound from a gland per unit time. Secretion rates have been assessed by sampling the venous effluent from a gland over time and subtracting out the arterial and peripheral venous hormone concentration. The metabolic clearance rate of a steroid is defined as the volume of blood that has been completely cleared of the hormone per unit time. The production rate of a steroid hormone refers to entry into the blood of the compound from all possible sources, including secretion from glands and conversion of prohormones into the steroid of interest. At steady state, the amount of hormone entering the blood from all sources will be equal to the rate at which it is being cleared (metabolic clearance rate) multiplied by blood concentration (production rate = metabolic clearance rate × concentration). If there is little contribution of prohormone metabolism to the circulating pool of steroid, then the production rate will approximate the secretion rate." Sources: See template.

=== Distribution ===
Estrogens are plasma protein bound to albumin and/or sex hormone-binding globulin in the circulation.

=== Metabolism ===
Estrogens are metabolized via hydroxylation by cytochrome P450 enzymes such as CYP1A1 and CYP3A4 and via conjugation by estrogen sulfotransferases (sulfation) and UDP-glucuronyltransferases (glucuronidation). In addition, estradiol is dehydrogenated by 17β-hydroxysteroid dehydrogenase into the much less potent estrogen estrone. These reactions occur primarily in the liver, but also in other tissues.

Estrogen metabolism in humans

Description: The metabolic pathways involved in the metabolism of estradiol and other natural estrogens (e.g., estrone, estriol) in humans. In addition to the metabolic transformations shown in the diagram, conjugation (e.g., sulfation and glucuronidation) occurs in the case of estradiol and metabolites of estradiol that have one or more available hydroxyl (–OH) groups. Sources: See template page.

=== Excretion ===
Estrogens are inactivated primarily by the kidneys and liver and excreted via the gastrointestinal tract in the form of conjugates, found in feces, bile, and urine.

== Medical use ==
Estrogens are used as medications, mainly in hormonal contraception, hormone replacement therapy, and to treat gender dysphoria in transgender women and other transfeminine individuals as part of feminizing hormone therapy.

== Chemistry ==
The estrogen steroid hormones are estrane steroids.

== History ==
In 1929, Adolf Butenandt and Edward Adelbert Doisy independently isolated and purified estrone, the first estrogen to be discovered. Then, estriol and estradiol were discovered in 1930 and 1933, respectively. Shortly following their discovery, estrogens, both natural and synthetic, were introduced for medical use. Examples include estriol glucuronide (Emmenin, Progynon), estradiol benzoate, conjugated estrogens (Premarin), diethylstilbestrol, and ethinylestradiol.

The word estrogen derives from Ancient Greek. It is derived from "oestros" (a periodic state of sexual activity in female mammals), and genos (generating). It was first published in the early 1920s and referenced as "oestrin". With the years, American English adapted the spelling of estrogen to fit with its phonetic pronunciation.

== Society and culture ==
=== Etymology ===
The name estrogen is derived from the Greek οἶστρος (oîstros), literally meaning "verve" or "inspiration" but figuratively sexual passion or desire, and the suffix -gen, meaning "producer of".

=== Environment ===
A range of synthetic and natural substances that possess estrogenic activity have been identified in the environment and are referred to xenoestrogens.

- Synthetic substances such as bisphenol A as well as metalloestrogens (e.g., cadmium).
- Plant products with estrogenic activity are called phytoestrogens (e.g., coumestrol, daidzein, genistein, miroestrol).
- Those produced by fungi are known as mycoestrogens (e.g., zearalenone).

Estrogens are among the wide range of endocrine-disrupting compounds because they have high estrogenic potency. When an endocrine-disrupting compound makes its way into the environment, it may cause male reproductive dysfunction to wildlife and humans. The estrogen excreted from farm animals makes its way into fresh water systems. During the germination period of reproduction the fish are exposed to low levels of estrogen which may cause reproductive dysfunction to male fish.

=== Cosmetics ===
Some hair shampoos on the market include estrogens and placental extracts; others contain phytoestrogens. In 1998, there were case reports of four prepubescent African-American girls developing breasts after exposure to these shampoos. In 1993, the FDA determined that not all over-the-counter topically applied hormone-containing drug products for human use are generally recognized as safe and effective and are misbranded. An accompanying proposed rule deals with cosmetics, concluding that any use of natural estrogens in a cosmetic product makes the product an unapproved new drug and that any cosmetic using the term "hormone" in the text of its labeling or in its ingredient statement makes an implied drug claim, subjecting such a product to regulatory action.

In addition to being considered misbranded drugs, products claiming to contain placental extract may also be deemed to be misbranded cosmetics if the extract has been prepared from placentas from which the hormones and other biologically active substances have been removed and the extracted substance consists principally of protein. The FDA recommends that this substance be identified by a name other than "placental extract" and describing its composition more accurately because consumers associate the name "placental extract" with a therapeutic use of some biological activity.

== See also ==
- List of steroid abbreviations
- Breastfeeding and fertility
- Vasoprotective
