= C18H26O5 =

The molecular formula C_{18}H_{26}O_{5} may refer to:

- Taleranol (β-zearalanol), a synthetic, nonsteroidal estrogen which was never marketed
- Zeranol (α-zearalanol), a synthetic nonsteroidal estrogen used mainly as an anabolic agent in veterinary medicine
