= Phytoandrogen =

Androgens and anabolic steroid

Phytoandrogens are substances produced in plants which have effects similar to testosterone in animals.

== Examples ==
- Triterpenoids from the Eucommia ulmoides tree can act as phytoandrogens.
- Drupanol is a phytoandrogen.

== Environmental effects ==
Phytoandrogens have been implicated in sex determination in fish.

== See also ==
- Phytoestrogen
- Plant hormone
