= Estrogenic fat =

Form of adipose tissue

Estrogenic fat likely refers to adipose tissue that develops under the direct influence of estrogens, particularly estradiol. The term, albeit not very common, specifically pertains to subcutaneous adipose tissue (also known as subcutaneous fat)

== Effects of estrogens on adipose tissue ==
Estrogenic fat mainly refers to the feminine secondary sex characteristic that develops at puberty and is maintained by estradiol throughout the premenopausal years, while estradiol production levels are maintained. It results from estrogenic contributions to the accumulation of fatty acids in the hips, thighs, and buttocks rather than the abdomen promoting a gynoid body shape. Estrogenic fat refers to subcutaneous adipose deposits as they are more sensitive to estrogen signaling than visceral adipose deposits due to higher concentrations of estrogen receptors than the latter. Studies have shown that not only does body fat distribution vary by sex, but is also modulated by sex hormones. Post menopausal women typically show a more android fat distribution following declines in estrogen and regain gynoid-like fat distribution with estrogen replacement.

Studies on sexual dimorphisms of obesity show that estradiol plays a part in the regulation of fat storage; specifically the balance between subcutaneous and visceral fat storage, and show an inverse relationship between visceral fat storage and estrogen levels

Both estrogen receptors (ERα and ERβ) have been identified in adipose tissue and direct action of estrogen signaling in adipose tissue has been shown in humans, mice, and rats. Direct effects of estrogen in adipose cells(adipocytes) includes modulation of cellular differentiation and proliferation, lipolysis, adipose tissue hyperplasia, cellular protein profile.

=== On subcutaneous adipose tissue ===
Many sex hormone receptors have been found in adipose tissue; with subcutaneous adipose tissue(SAT) possessing higher concentrations of estrogen receptors than androgen receptors. In addition, estrogen receptor activity is known to down regulate androgen receptor expression in SAT. Estrogen signaling promotes fat deposition in SAT depots which shifts fat storage dynamics away from visceral storage, which is linked to higher incidence of coronary artery disease. Clinical studies show the risk of metabolic dysfunction–associated steatotic liver disease (MASLD) in post menopausal women is significantly reduced with estrogen replacement therapy.

== Pre- and post-menopausal estrogen levels ==
Pre-menopausal women have higher levels of hormones, including estrogen. After menopause, subcutaneous fat depots in the breasts diminish due to lower levels adipocytes estrogen signaling, with a more pronounced decrease in estradiol levels.
