= Metalloestrogen =

Class of chemical compounds

Metalloestrogens are a class of inorganic xenoestrogens which can affect the gene expression of human cells responding to estrogen. Effects are related to the physiologic function of estrogen because metalloestrogens have shown affinity for estrogen receptors. Because they can mimic estrogen thus activating the receptor, they are considered harmful and potentially linked with breast cancer.

Examples of metalloestrogens include aluminium, antimony, arsenite, barium, cadmium, chromium (Cr(II)), cobalt, copper, lead, mercury, nickel, selenite, tin and vanadate.
