= Ipriflavone =

Chemical compound

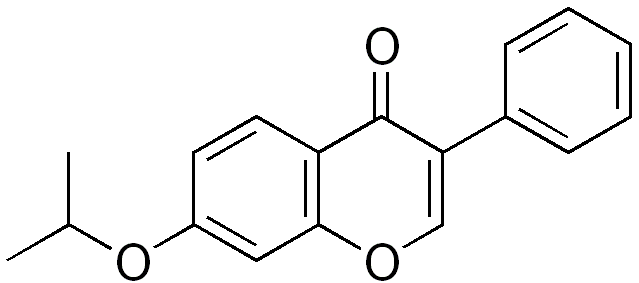

Clinical data
- Trade names: Yambolap
- Other names: FLI13; 7-Isopropoxyisoflavone
- AHFS/Drugs.com: International Drug Names
- ATC code: M05BX01 (WHO)

Legal status
- Legal status: US: Not FDA approved; Rx-only in Japan

Identifiers
- IUPAC name: 7-Isopropoxy-3-phenyl-4H-chromen-4-one
- CAS Number: 35212-22-7
- PubChem CID: 3747
- ChemSpider: 3616
- UNII: 80BJ7WN25Z
- KEGG: D01338
- ChEMBL: ChEMBL165790
- CompTox Dashboard (EPA): DTXSID5040679
- ECHA InfoCard: 100.125.854

Chemical and physical data
- Formula: C_{18}H_{16}O_{3}
- Molar mass: 280.323 g·mol^{−1}
- 3D model (JSmol): Interactive image
- SMILES: CC(C)OC1=CC2=C(C=C1)C(=O)C(=CO2)C3=CC=CC=C3
- InChI: InChI=1S/C18H16O3/c1-12(2)21-14-8-9-15-17(10-14)20-11-16(18(15)19)13-6-4-3-5-7-13/h3-12H,1-2H3; Key:SFBODOKJTYAUCM-UHFFFAOYSA-N

Ipriflavone (INN, JAN; brand name Yambolap) is a synthetic isoflavone which may be used to inhibit bone resorption, maintain bone density and to prevent osteoporosis in postmenopausal women. It is not used to treat osteoporosis. It slows down the action of the osteoclasts (bone-eroding cells), possibly allowing the osteoblasts (bone-building cells) to build up bone mass.

A clinical trial reported in 2001 that it was not effective in prevention or treatment of osteoporosis.

A double-blind study reveals that ipriflavone might be effective on reducing tinnitus on otosclerosis sufferers.

Ipriflavone has been described as a phytoestrogen. However, this is incorrect, as the drug does not bind to or activate the estrogen receptor and shows no estrogenic effects in postmenopausal women. The drug prevents bone loss via mechanisms that are distinct from those of estrogens.
