= Taleranol =

Chemical compound

Clinical data
- Other names: P-1560; Teranol; β-Zearalanol

Identifiers
- IUPAC name: (7S,11S)-7,15,17-Trihydroxy-11-methyl-12-oxabicyclo[12.4.0]octadeca-1(14),15,17-trien-13-one
- CAS Number: 42422-68-4
- PubChem CID: 65434
- UNII: HUN219N434
- ChEBI: CHEBI:35071
- ChEMBL: ChEMBL491510
- CompTox Dashboard (EPA): DTXSID3022532
- ECHA InfoCard: 100.164.729

Chemical and physical data
- Formula: C_{18}H_{26}O_{5}
- Molar mass: 322.401 g·mol^{−1}
- 3D model (JSmol): Interactive image
- SMILES: C[C@H]1CCC[C@@H](O)CCCCCc2cc(O)cc(O)c2C(=O)O1
- InChI: InChI=1S/C18H26O5/c1-12-6-5-9-14(19)8-4-2-3-7-13-10-15(20)11-16(21)17(13)18(22)23-12/h10-12,14,19-21H,2-9H2,1H3/t12-,14-/m0/s1; Key:DWTTZBARDOXEAM-JSGCOSHPSA-N

Taleranol (INN, USAN) (developmental code name P-1560), or teranol, also known as β-zearalanol, is a synthetic, nonsteroidal estrogen of the resorcylic acid lactone group related to mycoestrogens found in Fusarium spp which was never marketed. It is the β epimer of zeranol (α-zearalanol) and is a major metabolite of zeranol but with less biological activity.

== See also ==
- α-Zearalenol
- β-Zearalenol
- Zearalanone
- Zearalenone
