= Β-Zearalenol =

Chemical compound

β-Zearalenol

Clinical data
- Other names: beta-Zearalenol; beta-trans-Zearalenol

Identifiers
- IUPAC name: (2E,7S,11S)-7,15,17-trihydroxy-11-methyl-12-oxabicyclo[12.4.0]octadeca-1(18),2,14,16-tetraen-13-one
- CAS Number: 71030-11-0
- PubChem CID: 6437352
- ChemSpider: 5908979
- UNII: 35E809PP7O
- KEGG: C14751
- ChEBI: CHEBI:35072
- CompTox Dashboard (EPA): DTXSID8022533
- ECHA InfoCard: 100.190.517

Chemical and physical data
- Formula: C_{18}H_{24}O_{5}
- Molar mass: 320.385 g·mol^{−1}
- 3D model (JSmol): Interactive image
- SMILES: C[C@H]1CCC[C@H](CCC/C=C/C2=CC(=CC(=C2C(=O)O1)O)O)O
- InChI: InChI=1S/C18H24O5/c1-12-6-5-9-14(19)8-4-2-3-7-13-10-15(20)11-16(21)17(13)18(22)23-12/h3,7,10-12,14,19-21H,2,4-6,8-9H2,1H3/b7-3+/t12-,14-/m0/s1; Key:FPQFYIAXQDXNOR-PMRAARRBSA-N

β-Zearalenol is a nonsteroidal estrogen of the resorcylic acid lactone group related to mycoestrogens found in Fusarium spp. It is the β epimer of α-zearalenol and along with α-zearalenol is a major metabolite of zearalenone formed mainly in the liver but also to a lesser extent in the intestines during first-pass metabolism. A relatively high proportion of α-zearalenol is formed from zearalenone compared to β-zearalenol in humans. β-Zearalenol is about the same or slightly less potent as an estrogen relative to zearalenone.

== See also ==
- Taleranol (β-zearalanol)
- Zeranol (α-zearalanol)
- Zearalanone
