= Α-Zearalenol =

Chemical compound

α-Zearalenol

Clinical data
- Other names: alpha-Zearalenol; trans-Zearalenol; 2,4-Dihydroxy-6-(6α,10-dihydroxy-trans-1-undecenyl)benzoic acid μ-lactone

Identifiers
- IUPAC name: (2E,7R,11S)-7,15,17-trihydroxy-11-methyl-12-oxabicyclo[12.4.0]octadeca-1(14),2,15,17-tetraen-13-one
- CAS Number: 36455-72-8
- PubChem CID: 5284645
- ChemSpider: 4447689
- UNII: 59D4EVJ5KC
- KEGG: C14750
- ChEBI: CHEBI:35065
- ChEMBL: ChEMBL371463
- CompTox Dashboard (EPA): DTXSID8022402
- ECHA InfoCard: 100.264.264

Chemical and physical data
- Formula: C_{18}H_{24}O_{5}
- Molar mass: 320.385 g·mol^{−1}
- 3D model (JSmol): Interactive image
- SMILES: C[C@H]1CCC[C@@H](CCC/C=C/C2=CC(=CC(=C2C(=O)O1)O)O)O
- InChI: InChI=1S/C18H24O5/c1-12-6-5-9-14(19)8-4-2-3-7-13-10-15(20)11-16(21)17(13)18(22)23-12/h3,7,10-12,14,19-21H,2,4-6,8-9H2,1H3/b7-3+/t12-,14+/m0/s1; Key:FPQFYIAXQDXNOR-QDKLYSGJSA-N

α-Zearalenol is a nonsteroidal estrogen of the resorcylic acid lactone group related to mycoestrogens found in Fusarium spp. It is the α-epimer of β-zearalenol. Along with β-zearalenol, it is a major metabolite of zearalenone formed mainly in the liver but also to a lesser extent in the intestines during first-pass metabolism. A relatively low proportion of β-zearalenol is metabolized from zearalenone compared to α-zearalenol in humans. α-Zearalenol is about three to four times more potent as an estrogen relative to zearalenone.

== See also ==
- Taleranol (β-zearalanol)
- Zeranol (α-zearalanol)
- Zearalanone
