= Zearalenone =

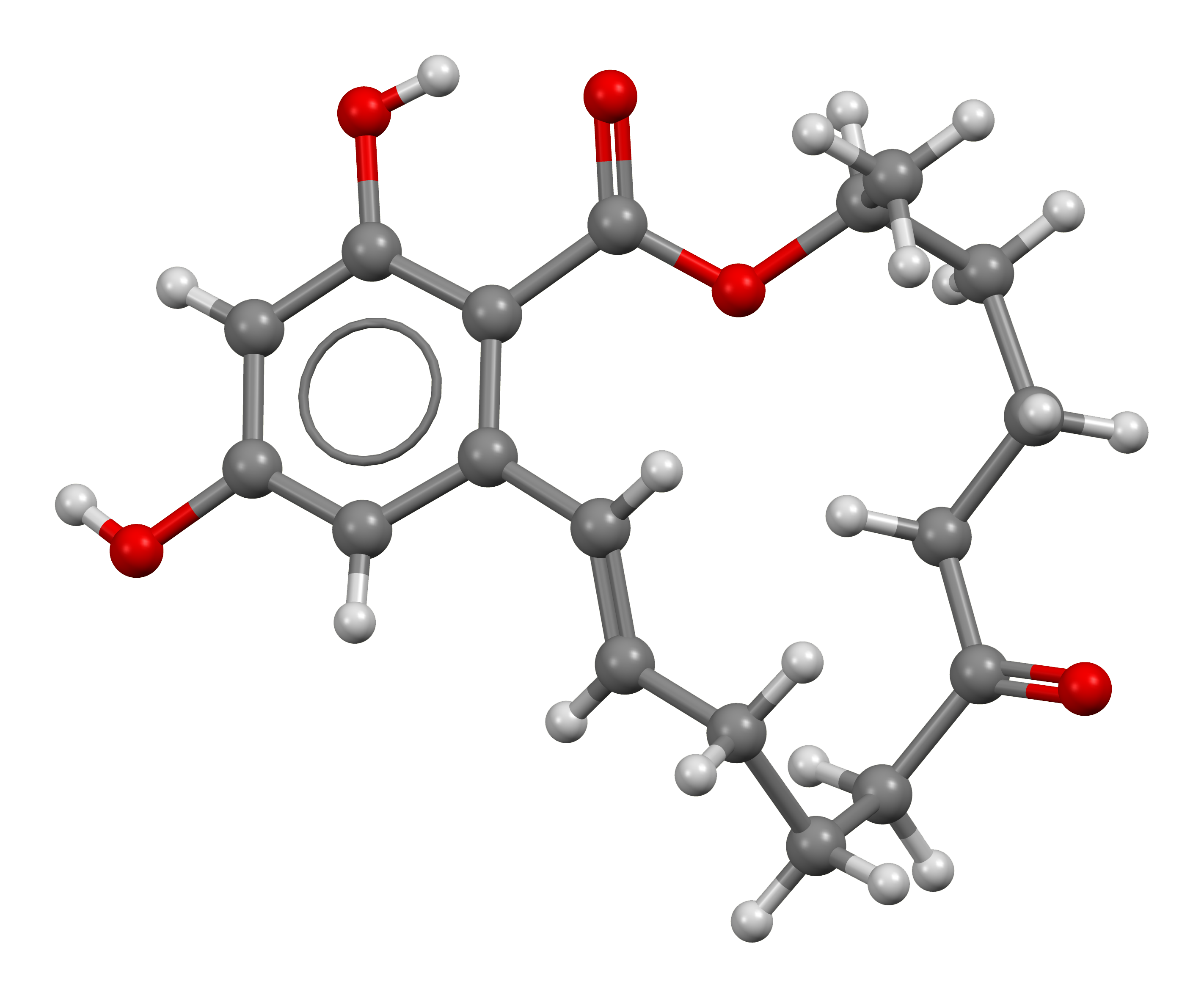

Names
- Preferred IUPAC name (3S,11E)-14,16-Dihydroxy-3-methyl-3,4,5,6,9,10-hexahydro-1H-2-benzoxacyclotetradecine-1,7(8H)-dione
- Other names Mycotoxin F2

Identifiers
CAS Number	17924-92-4
3D model (JSmol)	Interactive image
ChEBI	CHEBI:10106
ChEMBL	ChEMBL454173
ChemSpider	4444897
ECHA InfoCard	100.038.043
KEGG	C09981
PubChem CID	5281576
UNII	5W827M159J
CompTox Dashboard (EPA)	DTXSID0021460
- InChI: InChI=1S/C18H22O5/c1-12-6-5-9-14(19)8-4-2-3-7-13-10-15(20)11-16(21)17(13)18(22)23-12/h3,7,10-12,20-21H,2,4-6,8-9H2,1H3/b7-3+/t12-/m0/s1 Key: MBMQEIFVQACCCH-QBODLPLBSA-N; InChI=1/C18H22O5/c1-12-6-5-9-14(19)8-4-2-3-7-13-10-15(20)11-16(21)17(13)18(22)23-12/h3,7,10-12,20-21H,2,4-6,8-9H2,1H3/b7-3+/t12-/m0/s1 Key: MBMQEIFVQACCCH-QBODLPLBBS
- SMILES: C[C@H]1CCCC(=O)CCC/C=C/c2cc(cc(c2C(=O)O1)O)O

Properties
Chemical formula	C_{18}H_{22}O_{5}
Molar mass	318.369 g·mol^{−1}
- Except where otherwise noted, data are given for materials in their standard state (at 25 °C [77 °F], 100 kPa). verify (what is ?) Infobox references

Zearalenone (ZEN), also known as RAL and F-2 mycotoxin, is a potent estrogenic metabolite produced by some Fusarium and Gibberella species. Specifically, the Gibberella zeae, the fungal species where zearalenone was initially detected, in its asexual/anamorph stage is known as Fusarium graminearum. Several Fusarium species produce toxic substances of considerable concern to livestock and poultry producers, namely deoxynivalenol, T-2 toxin, HT-2 toxin, diacetoxyscirpenol (DAS) and zearalenone. Particularly, ZEN is produced by Fusarium graminearum, Fusarium culmorum, Fusarium cerealis, Fusarium equiseti, Fusarium verticillioides, and Fusarium incarnatum. Zearalenone is the primary toxin that binds to estrogen receptors, causing infertility, abortion or other breeding problems, especially in swine. Often, ZEN is detected together with deoxynivalenol in contaminated samples and its toxicity needs to be considered in combination with the presence of other toxins.

Zearalenone is heat-stable and is found worldwide in a number of cereal crops, such as maize, barley, oats, wheat, rice, and sorghum. Its production increases when the climate is warm with air humidity at or above twenty percent. The environmental pH plays also a role in the toxin's production. When temperatures fall to 15 °C, alkaline soils still support ZEN production. At the preferred Fusarium temperature, which ranges between 25 °C and 30 °C, neutral pH results in the greatest toxin production.

In addition to its actions on the classical estrogen receptors, zearalenone has been found to act as an agonist of the GPER (GPR30).

== Chemical and physical properties ==
Zearalenone is a white crystalline solid, with molecular formula C_{18}H_{22}O_{5} and 318.364 g/mol molecular weight. It is a resorcyclic acid lactone. It exhibits blue-green fluorescence when excited by long wavelength ultraviolet (UV) light (360 nm) and a more intense green fluorescence when excited with short wavelength UV light (260 nm). In methanol, UV absorption maxima occur at 236 (e = 29,700), 274 (e = 13,909) and 316 nm (e = 6,020). Maximum fluorescence in ethanol occurs with irradiation at 314 nm and with emission at 450 nm. Solubility in water is about 0.002 g/100 mL. It is slightly soluble in hexane and progressively more so in benzene, acetonitrile, methylene chloride, methanol, ethanol, and acetone. It is also soluble in aqueous alkali.

The naturally occurring isomer trans-zearalenone (trans-ZEN) is transformed by ultraviolet irradiation to cis-zearalenone (cis-ZEN).

== Metabolic pathways and products ==
Zearalenone is metabolically transformed to α-zearalenol (α-Zel) or (α-Zol), β-zearalenol (β-Zel) or (β-Zol), α-zearalanol (α-Zal), β-zearalanol (β-Zal), and zearalanone (ZAN) in animals. The relative composition of these metabolic products varies by species. In pigs, cows and ducks, α-Zel is the dominant form detected. In humans, both α-Zel and β-Zel are seen in urine samples, with the beta form being prevalent. In chickens, β-Zel is the dominant form and in plant cells, the metabolic product zeralenonne-14-O-β-glucoside has been detected. Additionally, in the organs of animals these metabolic products are further modified to yield zearalenone-14-glucuronide (ZEN-14GlcA), α-zearalenol-glucuronide (α-Zel-14G) and β-zearalenol-glucuronide (β-Zel-14G).

== Dermal exposure ==
Zearalenone can permeate through the human skin. However, no significant hormonal effects are expected after dermal contact in normal agricultural or residential environments.

== Reproduction ==
Zearalenone structure is similar to estrogens and α-zearalenol binds with an even greater affinity estrogen receptors, while β-zearalenol's affinity is lower than both the parent compound's and α-Zel's binding affinity. This identifies ZEN and its metabolites as xenoestrogens. The human and livestock exposure to ZEN through the diet poses health concern due to the onset of several sexual disorders and alterations in the development of sexual organs. There are reliable case reports of early puberty in girls chronically exposed to ZEN in various regions of the world. In mice, ZEN consumption was linked to a decline of potent sperm and egg cells, an increase to double-stranded breaks in DNA and activation of DNA repair mechanisms, followed by embryonic development challenges that reduced the viability of offspring.

== Sampling and analysis ==
In common with other mycotoxins, sampling food commodities for zearalenone must be carried out to obtain samples representative of the consignment under test. Commonly used extraction solvents are aqueous mixtures of methanol, acetonitrile, or ethyl acetate followed by a range of different clean-up procedures that depend in part on the food and on the detection method in use. Thin-layer chromatography (TLC) methods and high-performance liquid chromatography (HPLC) are commonly used. The TLC method for zearalenone is: normal phase silica gel plates, the eluent: 90% dichloromethane, 10% v/v acetone; or reverse phase C18 silica plates; the eluent: 90% v/v methanol, 10% water. Zearalenone gives unmistakable blue luminescence under UV. HPLC alone is not sufficient, as it may often yield false positive results. Today, HPLC-MS/MS analysis is used to quantify and confirm the presence of zearalenone.

Typically, the representative sample is commuted and homogenized then few grams are used for extraction with acetonitrile/water mixture. The procedure is the widely used QuEChERS method that quickly and effectively extracts small molecules, like mycotoxins and pesticides, from complex food matrices and animal tissues. The determination step relies on liquid chromatography - mass-spectrometry (LC-MS/MS). Another approach for the analysis of ZEA, without the requirement of expensive instrumentation, is developing specific peptide mimetic with the bioluminescent Gaussia luciferase fused as one protein that can bind specifically to ZEA.

== See also ==
- α-Zearalenol
- β-Zearalenol
- Taleranol
- Trichothecene
- Zeranol
- Zearalanone
