= Zeranol =

Chemical compound

Clinical data
- Trade names: Frideron, Ralabol, Ralgro, Ralone, Zerano
- Other names: Zearanol; α-Zearalanol; Zearalanol; MK-188; P-1496
- Routes of administration: By mouth
- Drug class: Nonsteroidal estrogen

Identifiers
- IUPAC name: (3S,7R)-7,14,16-trihydroxy-3-methyl-3,4,5,6,7,8,9,10,11,12-decahydro-1H-2-benzoxacyclotetradecin-1-one
- CAS Number: 26538-44-3
- PubChem CID: 2999413
- ChemSpider: 2271133
- UNII: 76LO2L2V39
- ChEMBL: ChEMBL371463
- CompTox Dashboard (EPA): DTXSID4022315
- ECHA InfoCard: 100.043.411

Chemical and physical data
- Formula: C_{18}H_{26}O_{5}
- Molar mass: 322.401 g·mol^{−1}
- 3D model (JSmol): Interactive image
- SMILES: C[C@H]1CCC[C@H](O)CCCCCc2cc(O)cc(O)c2C(=O)O1
- InChI: InChI=1S/C18H26O5/c1-12-6-5-9-14(19)8-4-2-3-7-13-10-15(20)11-16(21)17(13)18(22)23-12/h10-12,14,19-21H,2-9H2,1H3/t12-,14+/m0/s1; Key:DWTTZBARDOXEAM-GXTWGEPZSA-N

Zeranol (INN, USAN, BAN) (brand names Frideron, Ralabol, Ralgro, Ralone, Zerano; developmental code names MK-188, P-1496), or zearanol, also known as α-zearalanol or simply zearalanol, is a synthetic nonsteroidal estrogen of the resorcylic acid lactone group related to mycoestrogens found in fungi in the Fusarium genus and is used mainly as an anabolic agent in veterinary medicine.

Zeranol is approved for use as a growth promoter in livestock, including beef cattle, under the brand name Ralgro (by Merck Animal Health) in the United States. In Canada, it is approved for use in beef cattle only. Its application is not approved for use in the European Union. However, it is marketed under the brand name Ralone in Spain.

Although zeranol may increase cancer cell proliferation in already existing breast cancer, dietary exposure from the use of zeranol-containing implants in cattle is insignificant. Zeranol may be found as a contaminant in fungus-infected crops. It is 3 to 4 times more potent as an estrogen than the related compound zearalenone. It is a metabolite of zearalenone.

== See also ==
- α-Zearalenol
- β-Zearalenol
- Taleranol
- Zearalanone
- Beef hormone controversy
