= Mycoestrogen =

Xenoestrogens produced by fungi

Mycoestrogens are xenoestrogens produced by fungi. They are sometimes referred to as estrogenic mycotoxins. Some important mycoestrogens are zearalenone, zearalenol and zearalanol. Although all of these can be produced by various Fusarium species, zearalenol and zearalanol may also be produced endogenously in ruminants that have ingested zearalenone. Alpha-zearalanol is also produced semisynthetically, for veterinary use; such use is prohibited in the European Union.

== Mechanism of action ==
Mycoestrogens act as agonists of the estrogen receptors, ERα and ERβ.

== Sources ==
Mycoestrogens are produced by various strains of fungi, many of which fall under the genus Fusarium. Fusarium fungi are filamentous fungi that are found in the soil and are associated with plants and some crops, especially cereals. Zearalenone is mainly produced by F. graminearum and F. culmorum strains, which inhabit different areas depending on temperature and humidity. F. graminearum prefers to inhabit warmer and more humid locations such as Eastern Europe, Northern America, Eastern Australia, and Southern China in comparison to F. culmorum which is found in colder Western Europe.

== Health effects ==
Mycoestrogens mimic natural estrogen in the body by acting as estrogen receptor (ER) ligands. Mycoestrogens have been identified as endocrine disruptors due to their high binding affinity for ERα and ERβ, exceeding that of well known endocrine disruptors such as bisphenol A and DDT. Studies have been performed that strongly suggest a relationship between detectable levels of mycoestrogen and growth and pubertal development. More than one study has shown that detectable levels of zearalenone and its metabolite alpha-zearalanol in girls are associated with significantly shorter heights at menarche. Other reports have documented premature onset of puberty in girls. Estrogen are known to cause decreased body weight in model animals, and the same effect has been seen in rats exposed to zearalenone. Interactions of ZEN and its metabolite with human androgen receptors (hAR) have also been documented.

== Metabolism ==
Zearalenone has two major phase I metabolites: α-zearalenol and β-zearalenol. When exposed orally ZEN is absorbed by the intestinal lining and metabolized there as well as in the liver. Research into the metabolism of ZEN has been difficult because of the significant difference in biotransformation between species making comparison challenging.

=== Phase I ===
The first transformation of metabolism of ZEN will reduce the ketone group to an alcohol via aliphatic hydroxylation and result in the formation of the two zearalenol metabolites. This process is catalyzed by 3 α- and 3 β-hydroxy steroid dehydrogenase (HSD). CYP450 enzymes will then catalyze aromatic hydroxylation at the 13 or 15 position resulting in 13- or 15- catechols. Steric hindrance of at the 13 position is suspected to be the reason that in humans and rats there is more of the 15-catechol present. The catechols are the processed into mono-ethyl esters by catechol-o-methyl transferase (COMT) and S-adenosyl methionine (SAM). After this transformation they may be metabolized further to quinones which can cause the formation of reactive oxygen species (ROS) and cause covalent modification of DNA.

=== Phase II ===
In phase-II metabolizing includes glucuronidation and sulfation of the mycoestrogen compound. Glucuronidation is the major phase II metabolic pathway. The transferase UGT (5'-diphosphate glucuronosyltransferase) adds a glucuronic acid group sourced from uridine 5'-diphosphate glucuronic acid (UDPGA).

=== Excretion ===
Mycoestrogens and their metabolites are largely excreted in urine in humans and in feces in other animal systems.

== In food ==
Mycoestrogens are commonly found in stored grain. They can come from fungi growing on the grain as it grows, or after harvest during storage. Mycoestrogens can be found in silage. Some estimates state that 25% of global cereal production and 20% of global plant production may be at some point contaminated by mycotoxins of which mycoestrogens, especially those from fusarium strains, may make up a significant portion. Among mycoestrogens that contaminate plants are ZEN and its phase I metabolites. The limit for ZEN in unprocessed cereals, milling products, and cereal foodstuffs is 20-400 μg/kg (depending on the product in question).
