= Zearalanone =

Names
- Preferred IUPAC name (3S)-14,16-Dihydroxy-3-methyl-3,4,5,6,9,10,11,12-octahydro-1H-2-benzoxacyclotetradecine-1,7(8H)-dione
- Other names Mycotoxin, ZAN

Identifiers
CAS Number	5975-78-0
3D model (JSmol)	Interactive image
ChEBI	CHEBI:35051
ChEMBL	ChEMBL491499
ChemSpider	97115
ECHA InfoCard	100.165.079
KEGG	C14754
PubChem CID	108003
UNII	133DU2F2VS
CompTox Dashboard (EPA)	DTXSID6022395
- InChI: InChI=1S/C18H24O5/c1-12-6-5-9-14(19)8-4-2-3-7-13-10-15(20)11-16(21)17(13)18(22)23-12/h10-12,20-21H,2-9H2,1H3/t12-/m0/s1 Key: APJDQUGPCJRQRJ-LBPRGKRZSA-N
- SMILES: O=C1O[C@H](CCCC(=O)CCCCCc2cc(O)cc(O)c12)C

Properties
Chemical formula	C_{18}H_{24}O_{5}
Molar mass	320.385 g·mol^{−1}

Hazards
- GHS labelling
Pictograms	(GHS07: Exclamation mark) (GHS08: Health hazard)
Signal word	Warning
Hazard statements	H302, H312, H315, H319, H332, H335, H351
Precautionary statements	P201, P202, P261, P264, P270, P271, P280, P281, P301+P312, P302+P352, P304+P312, P304+P340, P305+P351+P338, P308+P313, P312, P321, P322, P330, P332+P313, P337+P313, P362, P363, P403+P233, P405, P501
- Except where otherwise noted, data are given for materials in their standard state (at 25 °C [77 °F], 100 kPa). Infobox references

Zearalanone (ZAN) is a mycoestrogen that is a derivative of zearalenone (ZEN). Zearalanone can be extracted from foodstuffs along with aflatoxins in the same time by a specific immunoaffinity column.

== See also ==
- α-Zearalenol
- β-Zearalenol
- Taleranol
- Zeranol
