= Aspergillus arachidicola =

Scientific classification
- Kingdom: Fungi
- Division: Ascomycota
- Class: Eurotiomycetes
- Order: Eurotiales
- Family: Aspergillaceae
- Genus: Aspergillus
- Species: A. arachidicola

Binomial name
- Aspergillus arachidicola Pildain, Frisvad & Samson (2008)

Species of fungus

Aspergillus arachidicola is a species of fungus in the genus Aspergillus. It is from the Flavi section. The species was first described in 2008. A. arachidicola has been shown to produce aflatoxin B1, aflatoxin B2, aflatoxin G1, aflatoxin G2, aspergillic acid, chrysogine, kojic acid, parasiticolide, and ditryphenaline.

== Growth and morphology ==
A. arachidicola has been cultivated on both Czapek yeast extract agar (CYA) plates and Malt Extract Agar Oxoid® (MEAOX) plates. The growth morphology of the colonies can be seen in the pictures below.

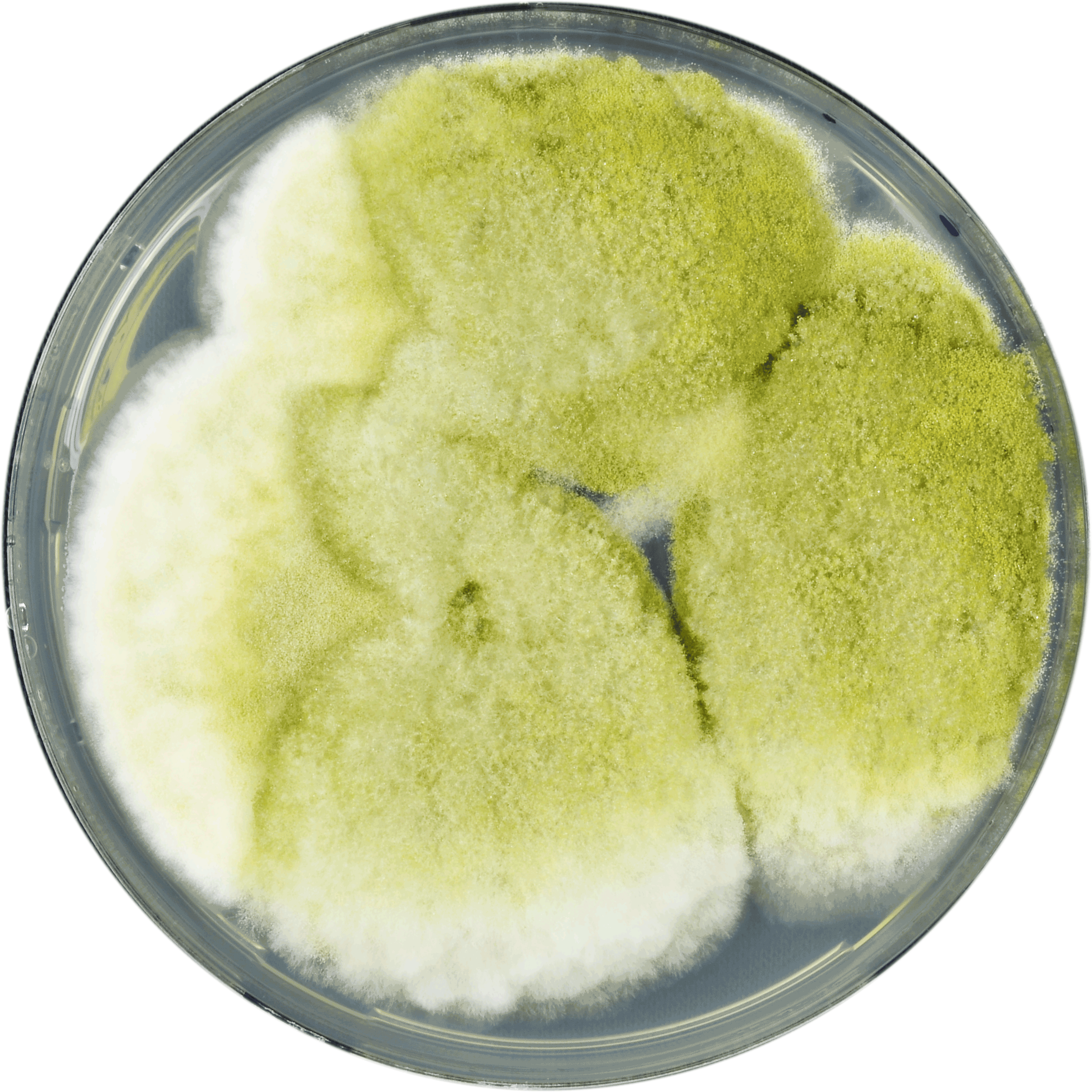
Aspergillus arachidicola growing on CYA plate

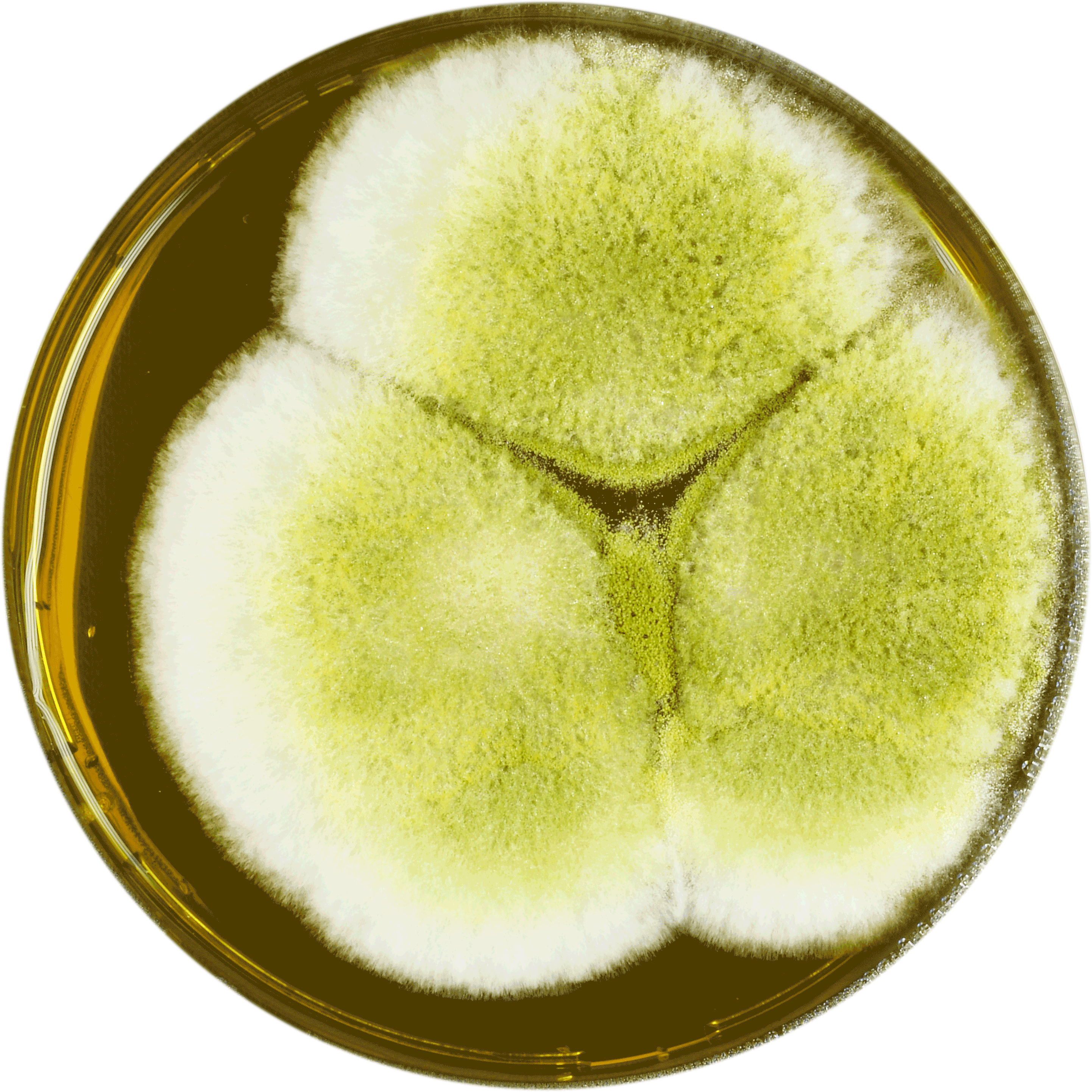
Aspergillus arachidicola growing on MEAOX plate
