= Aspergillus pseudonomius =

Scientific classification
- Kingdom: Fungi
- Division: Ascomycota
- Class: Eurotiomycetes
- Order: Eurotiales
- Family: Aspergillaceae
- Genus: Aspergillus
- Species: A. pseudonomius

Binomial name
- Aspergillus pseudonomius Varga, Frisvad & Samson, 2011

Species of fungus

Aspergillus pseudonomius is a species of fungus in the genus Aspergillus. It was first isolated from insects and soil in the United States. It is most related to Aspergillus nomius, producing aflatoxin B_{1}, chrysogine, and kojic acid.

== Growth and morphology ==
A. pseudonomius has been cultivated on both Czapek yeast extract agar (CYA) plates and Malt Extract Agar Oxoid® (MEAOX) plates. The growth morphology of the colonies can be seen in the pictures below.

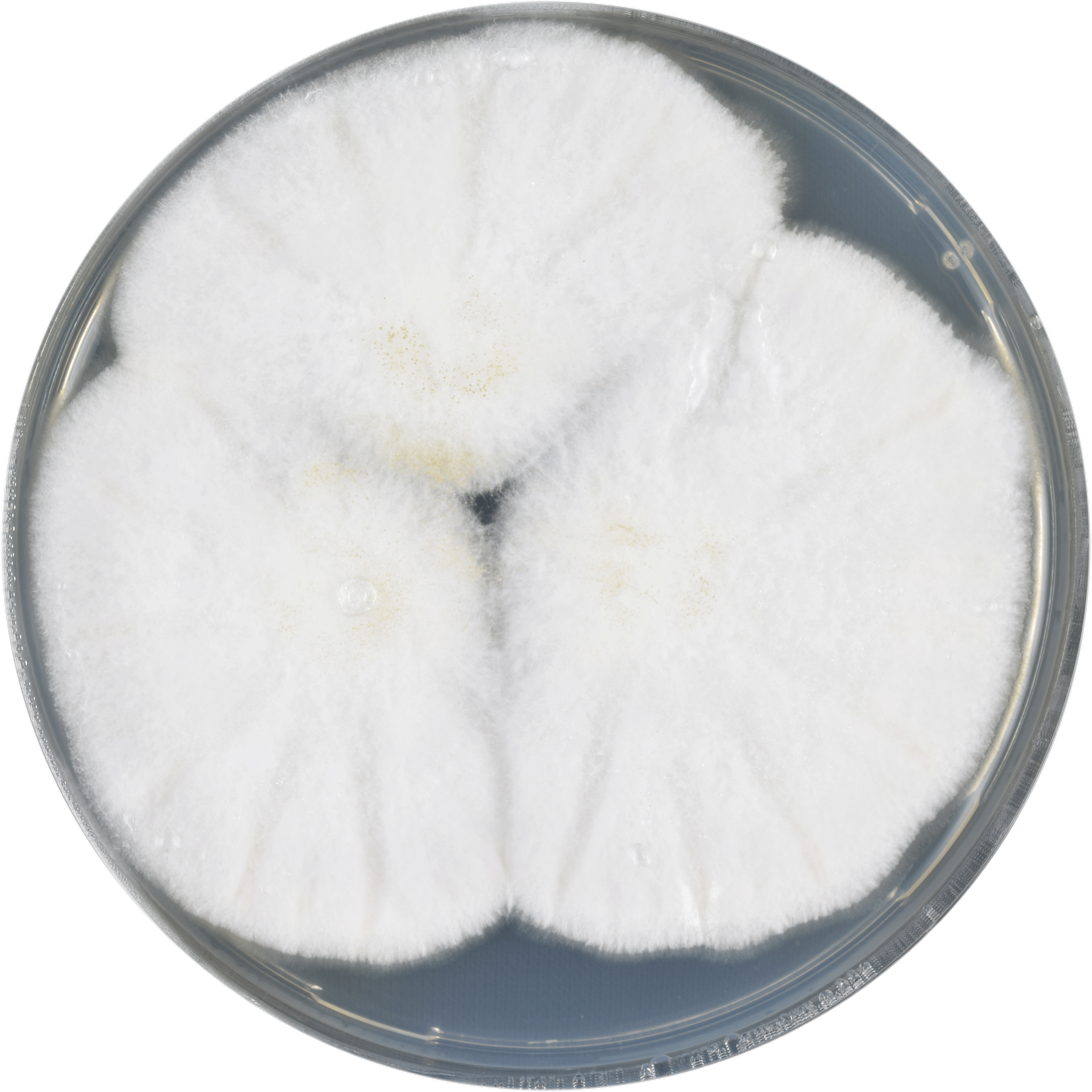
Aspergillus pseudonomius growing on CYA plate

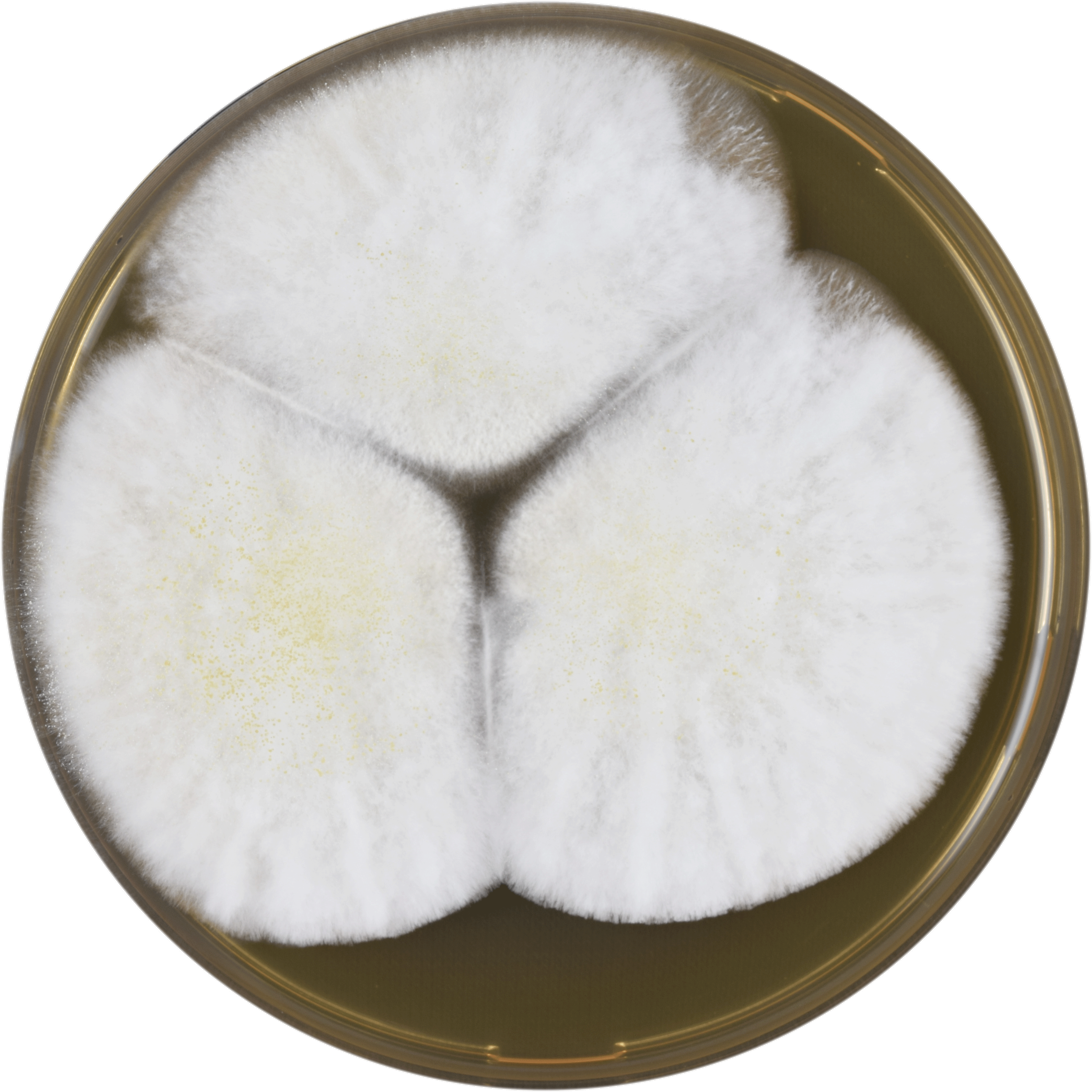
Aspergillus pseudonomius growing on MEAOX plate
