= Aflatoxin M1 =

Aflatoxin M_{1}

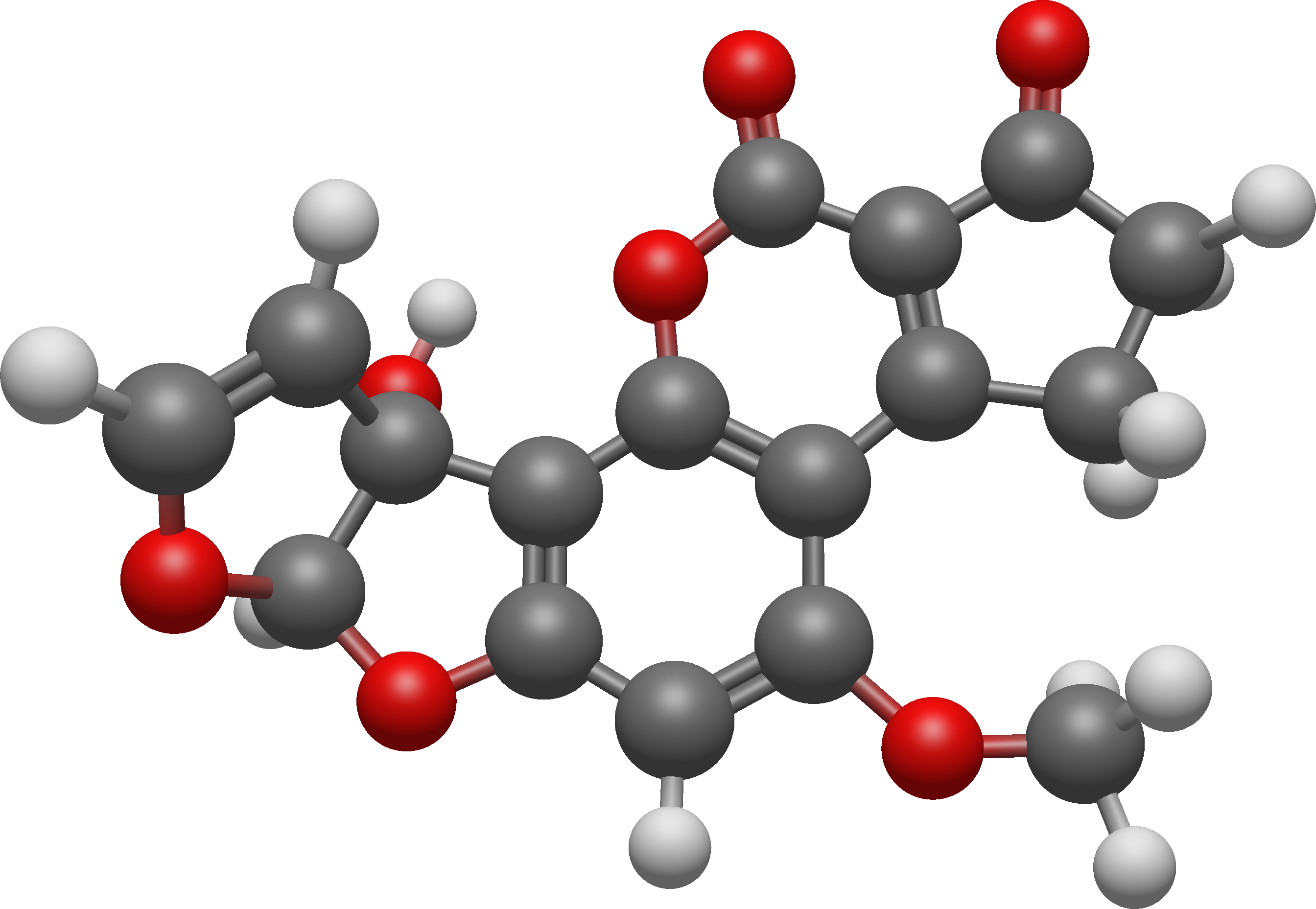

Names
- Preferred IUPAC name (6aR,9aR)-9a-Hydroxy-4-methoxy-2,3,6a,9a-tetrahydrocyclopenta[c]furo[3′,2′:4,5]furo[2,3-h][1]benzopyran-1,11-dione
- Other names 4-Hydroxyaflatoxin B_{1}

Identifiers
CAS Number	6795-23-9
3D model (JSmol)	Interactive image
Abbreviations	AFM1; AFM_{1}
ChEBI	CHEBI:78576
ChemSpider	21169428
ECHA InfoCard	100.027.151
EC Number	229-865-4
KEGG	C16756
PubChem CID	15558498
UNII	I3020O28I3
CompTox Dashboard (EPA)	DTXSID40891797
- InChI: InChI=1S/C17H12O7/c1-21-9-6-10-13(17(20)4-5-22-16(17)23-10)14-12(9)7-2-3-8(18)11(7)15(19)24-14/h4-6,16,20H,2-3H2,1H3/t16-,17-/m1/s1 Key: MJBWDEQAUQTVKK-IAGOWNOFSA-N
- SMILES: COC1=C2C3=C(C(=O)CC3)C(=O)OC2=C4C(=C1)O[C@@H]5[C@]4(C=CO5)O

Properties
Chemical formula	C_{17}H_{12}O_{7}
Molar mass	328.276 g·mol^{−1}
- Except where otherwise noted, data are given for materials in their standard state (at 25 °C [77 °F], 100 kPa). Infobox references

Aflatoxin M_{1} is a chemical compound of the aflatoxin class, a group of mycotoxins produced by three species of Aspergillus – Aspergillus flavus, Aspergillus parasiticus, and the rare Aspergillus nomius – which contaminate plant and plant products.

Aspergillus flavus produces only B-type aflatoxins. Aflatoxin M_{1} is the hydroxylated metabolite of aflatoxin B_{1} and can be found in milk or milk products obtained from livestock that have ingested contaminated feed. The carcinogenic potency of aflatoxin M_{1} in sensitive species is about one order of magnitude less than that of aflatoxin B_{1}. Aflatoxin M_{1} is usually considered to be a detoxication by-product of aflatoxin B_{1}. The main sources of aflatoxins in feeds are peanut, meal, maize and cottonseed meal.

== Chemical structure ==
The chemical structure of aflatoxin M_{1}. Aflatoxin M_{1} is the 4-hydroxy derivative of aflatoxin B_{1} and is secreted in the milk of mammals that consume aflatoxin B_{1}. Aflatoxin M_{1} has a relative molecular mass of 328 Da and has the molecular formula C_{17}H_{12}O_{7}.

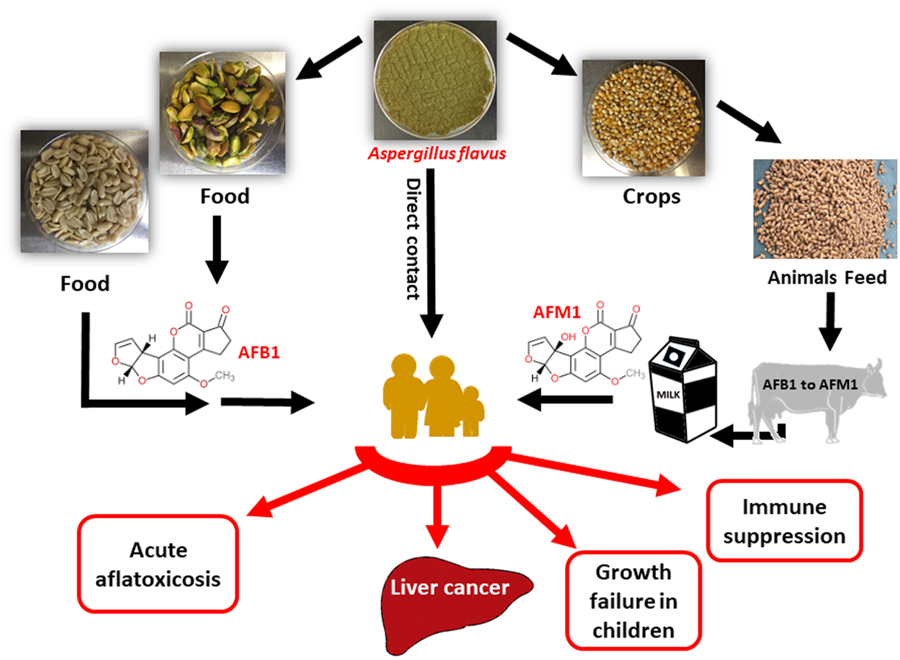
Schematic representation summarizing the major contamination and exposure routes and adverse health effects to human for the aflatoxins AFB1 and AFM1.

== Sources of exposure ==
Aflatoxin M_{1} may be found in milk, including human milk. In cows, sheep, goats and buffaloes that have consumed feeds contaminated with aflatoxin B_{1}, aflatoxin M_{1} will be formed as a result of the metabolic process in the livers of ruminants and excreted in their milk. Humans can be exposed to the toxins through consumption of contaminated milk and other foods.

== Pathology ==
The effect of aflatoxin M_{1} was much weaker than aflatoxin B_{1} in producing liver cancer. The limited animal studies carried out to determine toxicity of aflatoxin M_{1}. Aflatoxin M_{1} has toxic and carcinogenic properties. The toxicity of aflatoxin M_{1} in ducklings and rats seems to be slightly less than that of aflatoxin B_{1}. The carcinogenicity is probably one to two orders of magnitude less than that of the highly carcinogenic aflatoxin B_{1}.

== Bioconversion pathway ==
Aflatoxin M_{1} (AFM1), the principal hydroxylated metabolite of AFB1, is found in the milk (hence the designation M) of mammals fed with contaminated feedstuff. Carry-over of aflatoxin B_{1} (AFB1) as AFM1 in the milk of dairy cows has been established to range from 0.3% to 6.2%. However, AFM1 was also found in lactating mothers' milk. Several studies reported carcinogenic and immunosuppressive effects similar to that of AFB1, on both humans and other animals, even if with a less potent effect. However, AFM1 is the only mycotoxin for which maximum residue limits (MRLs) in milk were established.

== Toxicological study ==
Several studies have been undertaken of the toxic effects of aflatoxin M_{1} in laboratory animals. However, in comparison to aflatoxin B_{1}, relatively little is known about the toxicity of aflatoxin M_{1}, primarily because of the difficulty in obtaining sufficient quantities of the pure compound necessary for extensive toxicity testing.

Species	Sex	Dose	Result
Trout (fry) up to 12 months	Male	8 μg/kg 4-64 μg/kg (120 treated/group) 800 μg/kg	No tumours (0/110) Liver tumour response: 0.086 % 50 % tumours at 9 months
Fischer rats	Male	0 μg/kg 0.5 μg/kg 5 μg/kg 50 μg/kg	Liver cancer 0 % neoplastic nodules 0 % Liver cancer 0 % neoplastic nodules 0 % Liver cancer 0 % neoplastic nodules 0 % Liver cancer 5 % neoplastic nodules 16 %
Fischer rats	Male	1 mg/rat	Liver cancer 1 of 29

== Genotoxicity ==
The potency of aflatoxin B_{1} and aflatoxin M_{1} in inducing DNA damage and genotoxicity was tested in Drosophila melanogaster. Aflatoxin M_{1} was found to be a DNA-damaging agent, with an activity about one-third that of aflatoxin B_{1}.

== Analytical methods ==
Many methods have become available for the determination of aflatoxin M_{1} in milk. In particular, solid-phase correction and immunoaffinity chromatography cartridges offer good possibilities for efficient clean up. Both thin-layer chromatography (TLC) and high performance liquid chromatography (HPLC) are adequate techniques to separate and determine aflatoxin M_{1} in extracts of milk. Enzyme-linked immune sorbent assay (ELISA) is more popular, due to ease of use and properties which are conducive to rapid screening and semi-quantitative determination. Aflatoxins determinations are usually expensive and employ environmentally unfriendly procedures, thus, the search for new materials and technologies, that are both ecologically safe and inexpensive its rice husk as an adsorbent method.

== Regulation ==
According to a recent review conducted by the Dutch National Institute for Public Health and the Environment (RIVM) on behalf of the Food and Agriculture Organization (FAO) approximately 60 countries have set specific limits for aflatoxin M_{1}. The European Union countries generally apply a maximum level of 0.05 μg/kg milk. Some countries in Africa, Asia and Latin America also propose this level. In contrast, the USA as well as some European and several Asian countries accept a maximum level of 0.5 μg/kg aflatoxin M_{1} in milk, which is also the harmonized Mercosur limit applied in Latin America. The 0.5 μg/kg limit for aflatoxin M_{1}. Thus, the maximum permitted level of aflatoxin M_{1} in milk in the EU is among the lowest in the world, and is based on the ALARA (As Low As Reasonably Achievable) principle. Considering the carry-over into milk and the established adverse effects on animal health, approximately 45 countries have set specific levels for aflatoxin B_{1} in feed for dairy animals. To support compliance with the maximum levels in milk intended for human consumption, stringent maximum levels were also set in the EU for feed stuffs which might be consumed by dairy cows. A limit of 0.005 mg/kg feed for dairy cattle is applied in the EU countries and in the new member states as well as in Europe Union countries, but only in few countries outside Europe. This level is below the no-effect level in target animals.
