= Aspergillus pseudocaelatus =

Scientific classification
- Kingdom: Fungi
- Division: Ascomycota
- Class: Eurotiomycetes
- Order: Eurotiales
- Family: Aspergillaceae
- Genus: Aspergillus
- Species: A. pseudocaelatus

Binomial name
- Aspergillus pseudocaelatus Varga, Frisvad & Samson, 2011

Species of fungus

Aspergillus pseudocaelatus is a species of fungus in the genus Aspergillus. It was first isolated from an Arachis burkartii leaf in Argentina. It is most related to the non-aflatoxin producing Aspergillus caelatus, producing aflatoxins B and G, as well as cyclopiazonic acid and kojic acid.

== Growth and morphology ==
A. pseudocaelatus has been cultivated on both Czapek yeast extract agar (CYA) plates and Malt Extract Agar Oxoid® (MEAOX) plates. The growth morphology of the colonies can be seen in the pictures below.

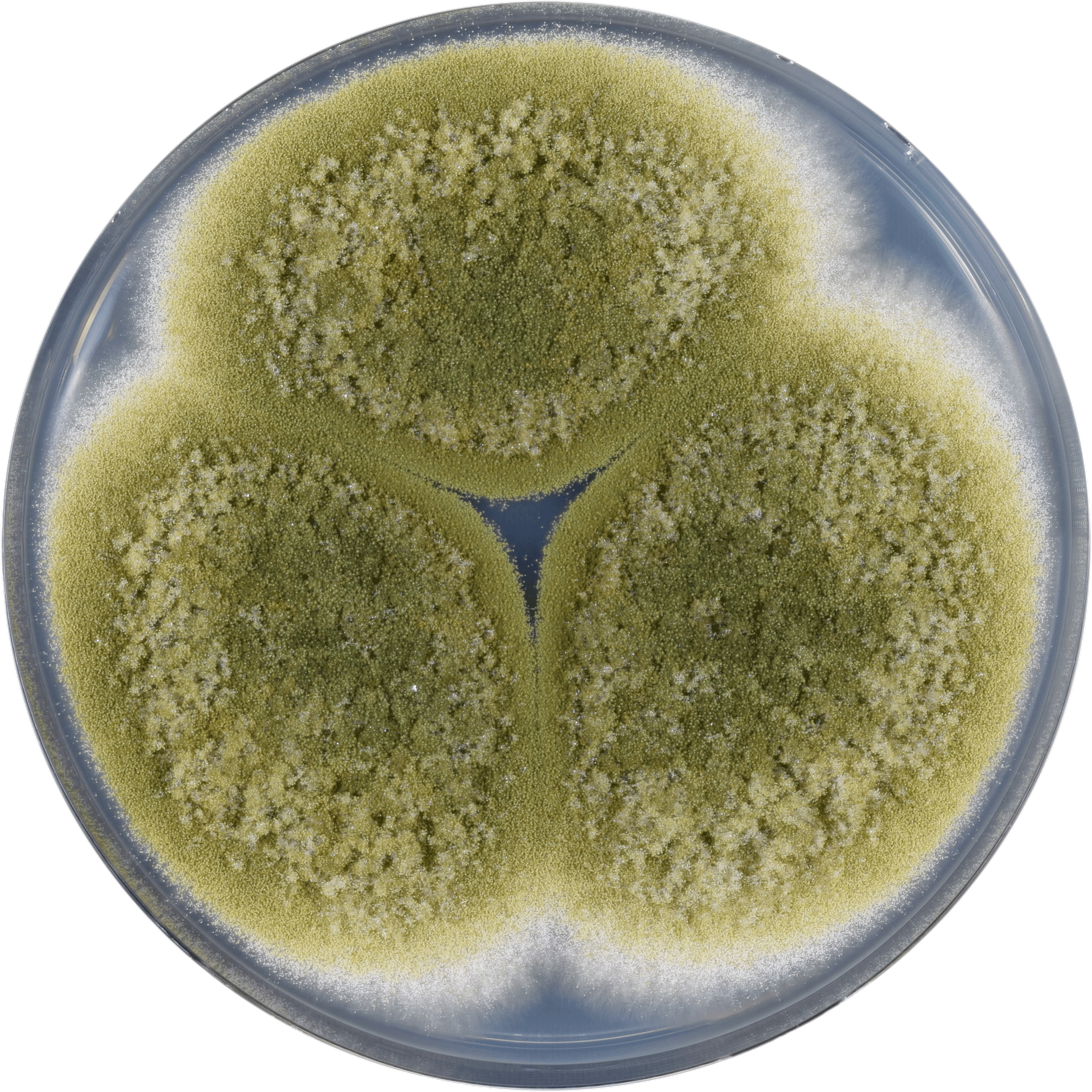
Aspergillus pseudocaelatus growing on CYA plate

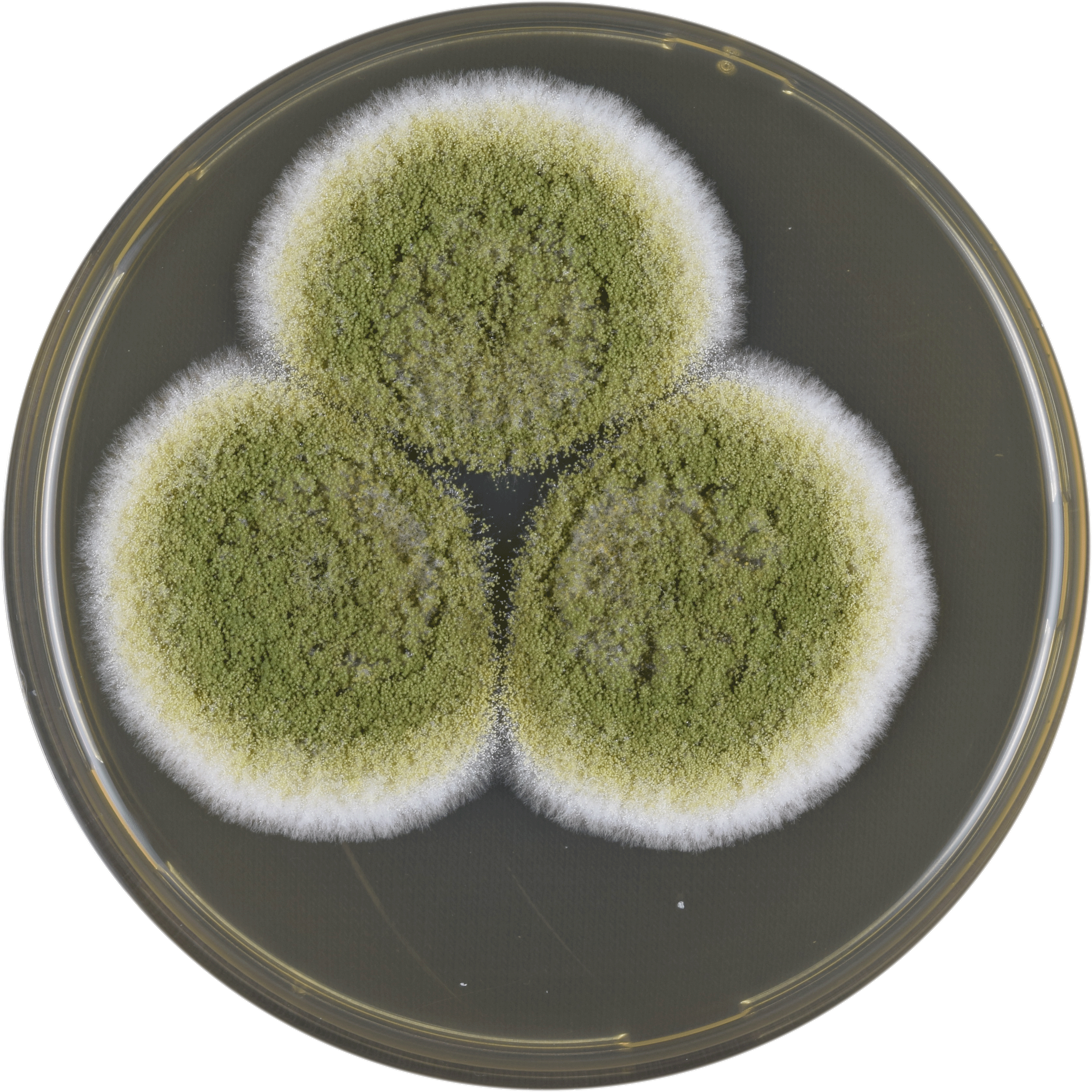
Aspergillus pseudocaelatus growing on MEAOX plate
