= Aspergillus leporis =

Scientific classification
- Kingdom: Fungi
- Division: Ascomycota
- Class: Eurotiomycetes
- Order: Eurotiales
- Family: Aspergillaceae
- Genus: Aspergillus
- Species: A. leporis

Binomial name
- Aspergillus leporis States & M. Christensen (1966)

Species of fungus

Aspergillus leporis is an anamorph species of fungus in the genus Aspergillus. It is from the Flavi section. The species was first described in 1979. It has been isolated from the dung of Lepus townsendii. Aspergillus leporis produces leporin A and leporin B. It has also been reported to produce antibiotic Y, kojic acid, and pseurotin.

== Growth and morphology ==
A. leporis has been cultivated on both Czapek yeast extract agar (CYA) plates and Malt Extract Agar Oxoid® (MEAOX) plates. The growth morphology of the colonies can be seen in the pictures below.

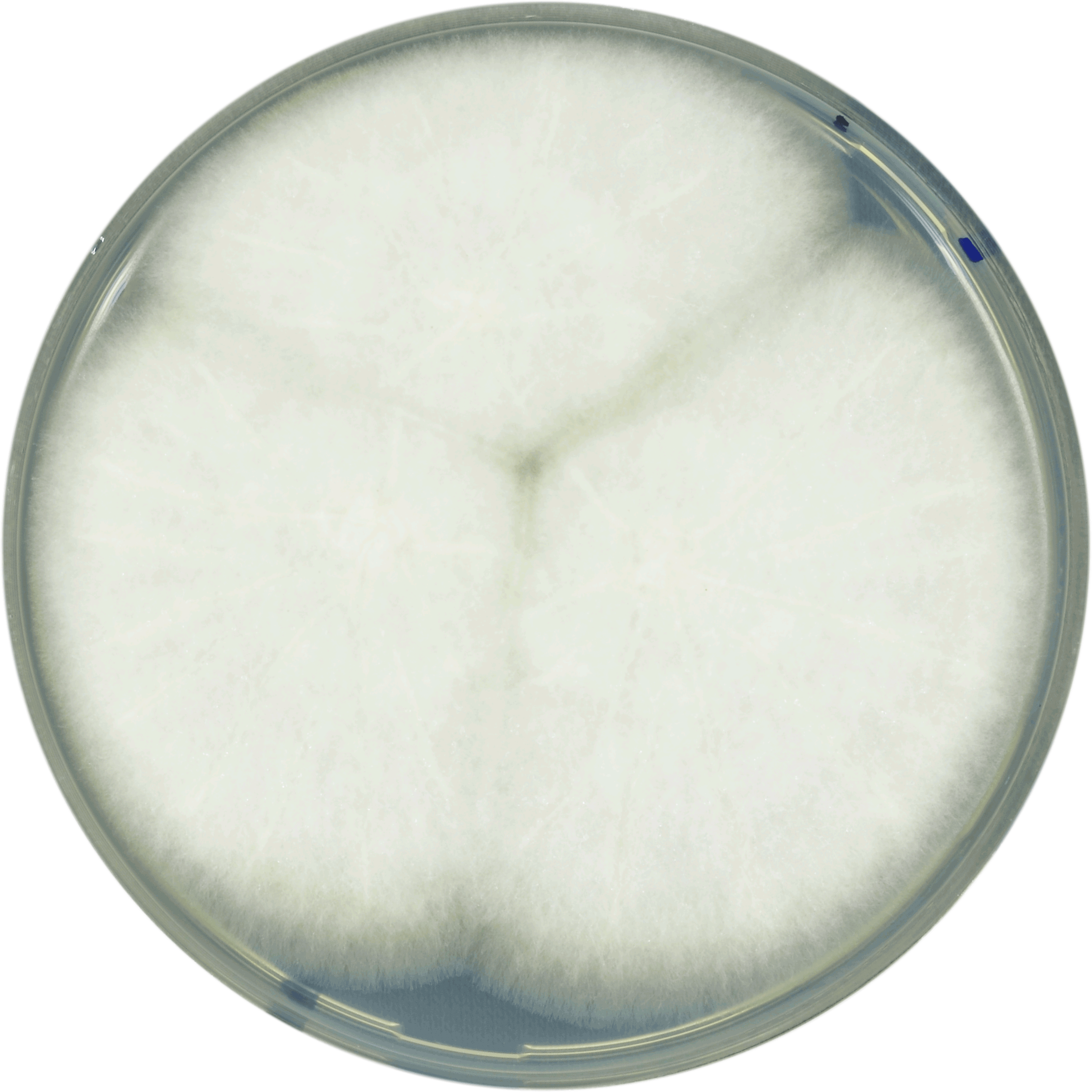
Aspergillus leporis growing on CYA plate

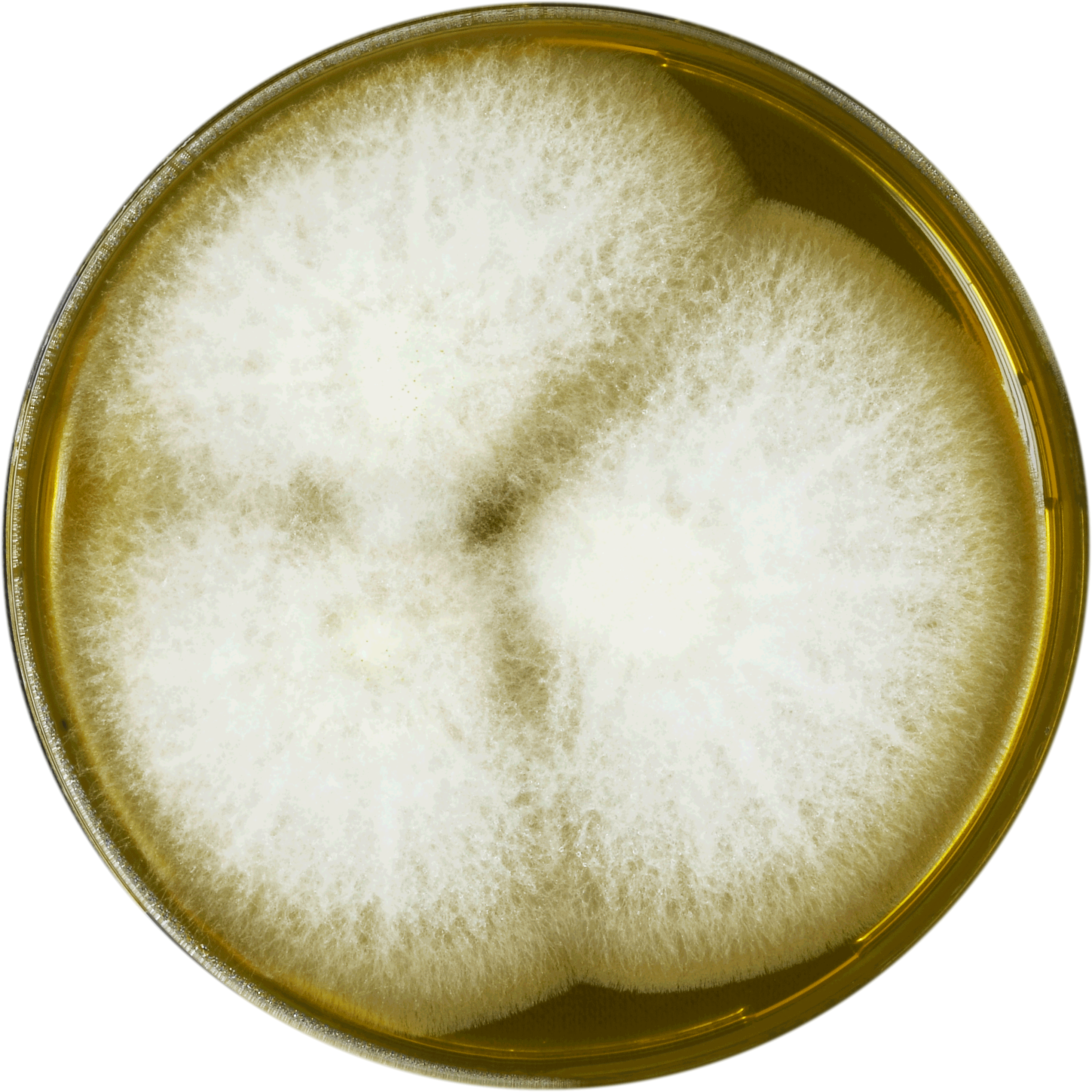
Aspergillus leporis growing on MEAOX plate
