= Aspergillus minisclerotigenes =

Scientific classification
- Kingdom: Fungi
- Division: Ascomycota
- Class: Eurotiomycetes
- Order: Eurotiales
- Family: Aspergillaceae
- Genus: Aspergillus
- Species: A. minisclerotigenes

Binomial name
- Aspergillus minisclerotigenes Vaamonde, Frisvad & Samson (2008)

Species of fungus

Aspergillus minisclerotigenes is a species of fungus in the genus Aspergillus. It is from the Flavi section. The species was first described in 2008. It has been reported to produce aflatoxin B1, aflatoxin B2, aflatoxin G1, aflatoxin G2, aflavarins, aflatrems, aflavinins, aspergillic acid, cyclopiazonic acid, and paspalinine.

== Growth and morphology ==
A. minisclerotigenes has been cultivated on both Czapek yeast extract agar (CYA) plates and Malt Extract Agar Oxoid® (MEAOX) plates. The growth morphology of the colonies can be seen in the pictures below.

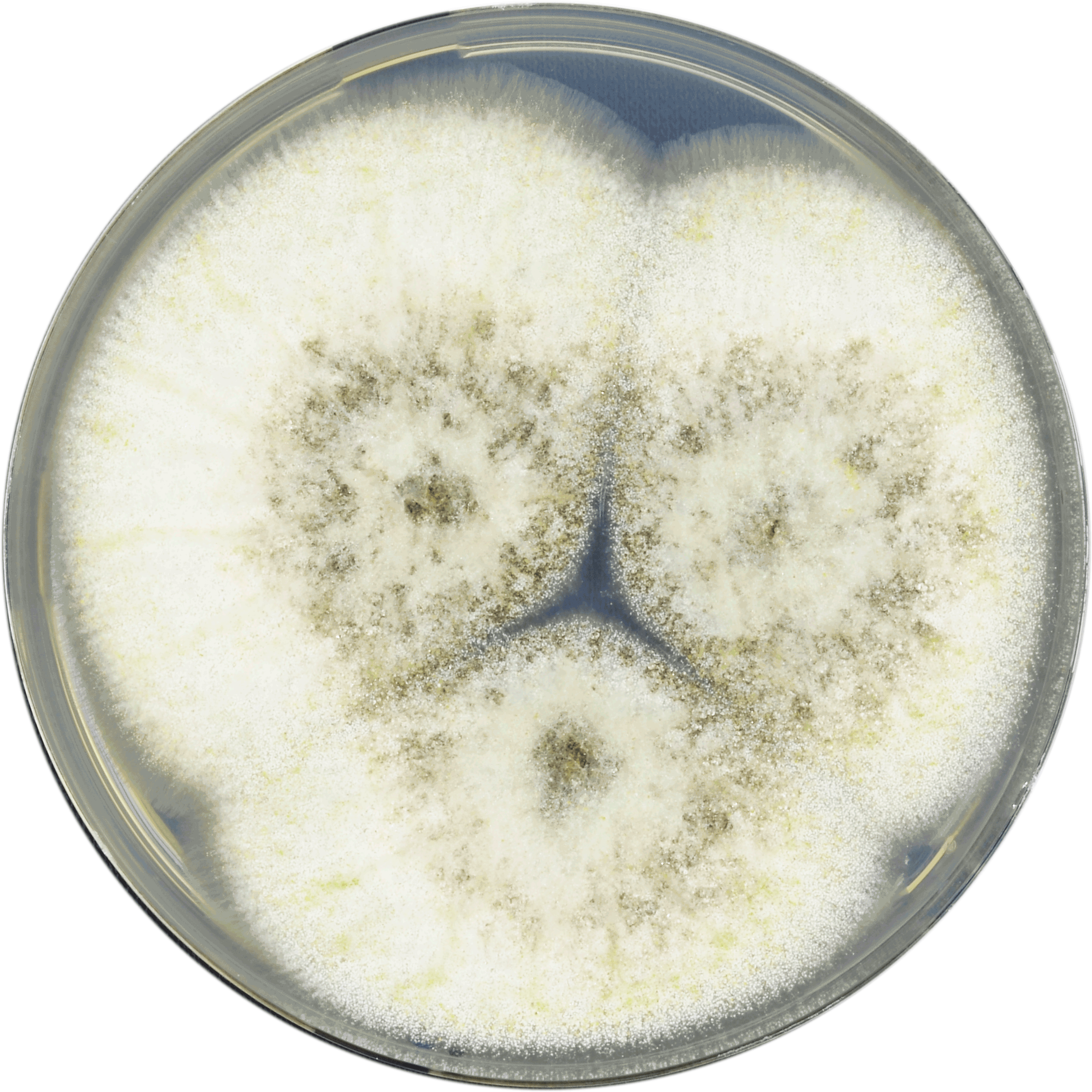
Aspergillus minisclerotigenes growing on CYA plate

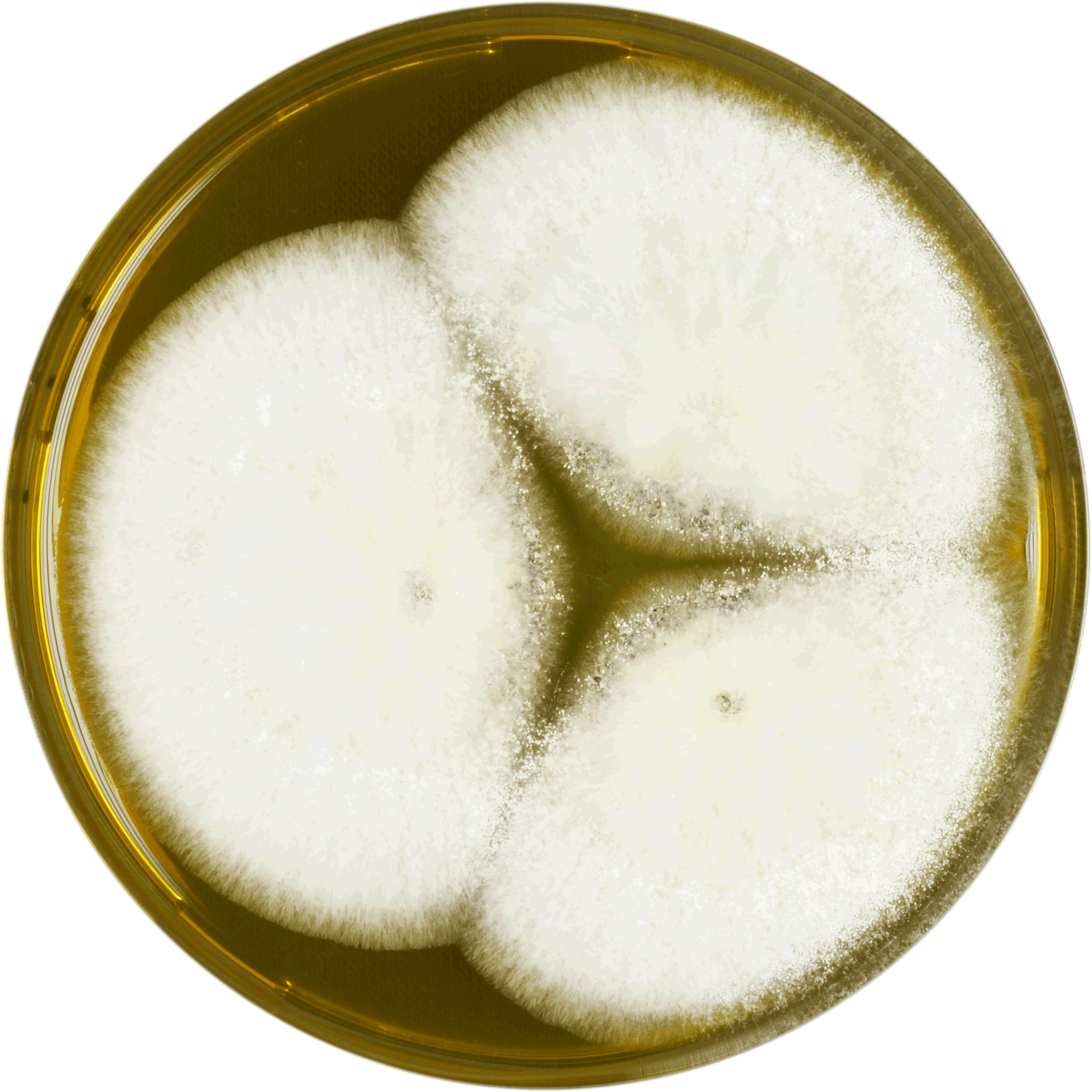
Aspergillus minisclerotigenes growing on MEAOX plate
