= Mycotoxicology =

Study of toxins produced by fungi

Mycotoxicology is the branch of mycology that focuses on analyzing and studying the toxins produced by fungi, known as mycotoxins. In the food industry it is important to adopt measures that keep mycotoxin levels as low as practicable, especially those that are heat-stable. These chemical compounds are the result of secondary metabolism initiated in response to specific developmental or environmental signals. This includes biological stress from the environment, such as lower nutrients or competition for those available. Under this secondary path the fungus produces a wide array of compounds in order to gain some level of advantage, such as incrementing the efficiency of metabolic processes to gain more energy from less food, or attacking other microorganisms and being able to use their remains as a food source.

Mycotoxins are made by fungi and are toxic to vertebrates and other animal groups in low concentrations. Low-molecular-weight fungal metabolites such as ethanol that are toxic only in high concentrations are not considered mycotoxins. Mushroom poisons are fungal metabolites that can cause disease and death in humans and other animals; they are rather arbitrarily excluded from discussions of mycotoxicology. Molds make mycotoxins; mushrooms and other macroscopic fungi make mushroom poisons. The distinction between a mycotoxin and a mushroom poison is based not only on the size of the producing fungus, but also on human intention. Mycotoxin exposure is almost always accidental. In contrast, with the exception of the victims of a few mycologically accomplished murderers, mushroom poisons are usually ingested by amateur mushroom hunters who have collected, cooked, and eaten what was misidentified as a harmless, edible species.

Mycotoxins are hard to define and are also very difficult to classify. Mycotoxins have diverse chemical structures, biosynthetic origins, myriad biological effects, and produce numerous different fungal species. Classification generally reflects the training of the categorizer and does not adhere to any set system. Mycotoxins are often arranged by physicians depending on what organ they effect. Mycotoxins can be categorized as nephrotoxins, hepatoxins, immunotoxins, neurotoxins, etc. Generic groups created by cell biologist are teratogens, mutagens, allergens, and carcinogens. Organic chemists have attempted to classify them by their chemical structures (e.g., lactones, coumarins); biochemists according to their biosynthetic origins (polyketides, amino acid-derived, etc.); physicians by the illnesses they cause (e.g., St. Anthony's fire, stachybotryotoxicosis), and mycologists by the fungi that produce them (e.g., Aspergillus toxins, Penicillium toxins). None of these classifications is entirely satisfactory. Aflatoxin, for example, is a hepatotoxic, mutagenic, carcinogenic, difuran-containing, polyketide-derived Aspergillus toxin. Zearalenone is a Fusarium metabolite with potent estrogenic activity; hence, in addition to being called (probably erroneously) a mycotoxin, it also has been labeled a phytoestrogen, a mycoestrogen, and a growth promotant.

== Types of mycotoxins ==
=== Citrinin ===
Citrinin was first isolated from Penicillium citrinum prior to World War II; subsequently, it was identified in over a dozen species of Penicillium and several species of Aspergillus (e.g., Aspergillus terreus and Aspergillus niveus), including certain strains of Penicillium camemberti (used to produce cheese) and Aspergillus oryzae (used to produce sake, miso, and soy sauce). More recently, citrinin has also been isolated from Monascus ruber and Monascus purpureus, industrial species used to produce red pigments.

=== Aflatoxins ===
The aflatoxins were isolated and characterized after the death of more than 100,000 turkey poults (turkey X disease) was traced to the consumption of a mold-contaminated peanut meal. The four major aflatoxins are called B1, B2, G1, and G2 based on their fluorescence under UV light (blue or green) and relative chromatographic mobility during thin-layer chromatography. Aflatoxin B1 is the most potent natural carcinogen known and is usually the major aflatoxin produced by toxigenic strains. It is also the best studied: in a large percentage of the papers published, the term aflatoxin can be construed to mean aflatoxin B1. However, well over a dozen other aflatoxins (e.g., P1. Q1, B2a, and G2a) have been described, especially as mammalian biotransformation products of the major metabolites. The classic book Aflatoxin: Scientific Background, Control, and Implications, published in 1969, is still a valuable resource for reviewing the history, chemistry, toxicology, and agricultural implications of aflatoxin research.

=== Fumonisins ===
Fumonisins were first described and characterized in 1988. The most abundantly produced member of the family is fumonisin B1. They are thought to be synthesized by condensation of the amino acid alanine into an acetate-derived precursor. Fumonisins are produced by a number of Fusarium species, notably Fusarium verticillioides (formerly Fusarium moniliforme = Gibberella fujikuroi), Fusarium proliferatum, and Fusarium nygamai, as well as Alternaria alternata f. sp. lycopersici. These fungi are taxonomically challenging, with a complex and rapidly changing nomenclature which has perplexed many nonmycologists (and some mycologists, too). The major species of economic importance is Fusarium verticillioides, which grows as a corn endophyte in both vegetative and reproductive tissues, often without causing disease symptoms in the plant. However, when weather conditions, insect damage, and the appropriate fungal and plant genotype are present, it can cause seedling blight, stalk rot, and ear rot. Fusarium verticillioides is present in virtually all corn samples. Most strains do not produce the toxin, so the presence of the fungus does not necessarily mean that fumonisin is also present. Although it is phytotoxic, fumonisin B1 is not required for plant pathogenesis.

=== Ochratoxins ===
Ochratoxin A was discovered as a metabolite of Aspergillus ochraceus in 1965 during a large screen of fungal metabolites that was designed specifically to identify new mycotoxins. Shortly thereafter, it was isolated from a commercial corn sample in the United States and recognized as a potent nephrotoxin. Members of the ochratoxin family have been found as metabolites of many different species of Aspergillus, including Aspergillus alliaceus, Aspergillus auricomus, Aspergillus carbonarius, Aspergillus glaucus, Aspergillus melleus, and Aspergillus niger. Because Aspergillus niger is used widely in the production of enzymes and citric acid for human consumption, it is important to ensure that industrial strains are nonproducers. Although some early reports implicated several Penicillium species, it is now thought that Penicillium verrucosum, a common contaminant of barley, is the only confirmed ochratoxin producer in this genus. Nevertheless, many mycotoxin reviews reiterate erroneous species lists.

=== Patulin ===
Patulin is produced by many different molds but was first isolated as an antimicrobial active principle during the 1940s from Penicillium patulum (later called Penicillium urticae, now Penicillium griseofulvum). The same metabolite was also isolated from other species and given the names clavacin, claviformin, expansin, mycoin C, and penicidin. A number of early studies were directed towards harnessing its antibiotic activity. For example, it was tested as both a nose and throat spray for treating the common cold and as an ointment for treating fungal skin infections However, during the 1950s and 1960s, it became apparent that, in addition to its antibacterial, antiviral, and antiprotozoal activity, patulin was toxic to both plants and animals, precluding its clinical use as an antibiotic. During the 1960s, patulin was reclassified as a mycotoxin.

=== Trichothecenes ===
The trichothecenes constitute a family of more than sixty sesquiterpenoid metabolites produced by a number of fungal genera, including Fusarium, Myrothecium, Phomopsis, Stachybotrys, Trichoderma, Trichothecium, and others. The term trichothecene is derived from trichothecin, which was one of the first members of the family identified. All trichothecenes contain a common 12,13-epoxytrichothene skeleton and an olefinic bond with various side chain substitutions. They are commonly found as food and feed contaminants, and consumption of these mycotoxins can result in alimentary hemorrhage and vomiting; direct contact causes dermatitis.

=== Zearalenone ===
Zearalenone, a secondary metabolite from Fusarium graminearum (teleomorph Gibberella zeae), was given the trivial name zearalenone as a combination of G. zeae, resorcylic acid lactone, -ene (for the presence of the C-1′ to C-2 double bond), and -one, for the C-6′ ketone. Almost simultaneously, a second group isolated, crystallized, and studied the metabolic properties of the same compound and named it F-2. Much of the early literature uses zearalenone and F-2 as synonyms; the family of analogues are known as zearalenones and F-2 toxins, respectively. Perhaps because the original work on these fungal macrolides coincided with the discovery of aflatoxins, chapters on zearalenone have become a regular fixture in monographs on mycotoxins (see, for example, Mirocha and Christensen and Betina). Nevertheless, the word toxin is almost certainly a misnomer because zearalenone, while biologically potent, is hardly toxic; rather, it sufficiently resembles 17β-estradiol, the principal hormone produced by the human ovary, to allow it to bind to estrogen receptors in mammalian target cells Zearalenone is better classified as a nonsteroidal estrogen or mycoestrogen. Sometimes it is called a phytoestrogen. For the structure-activity relationships of zearalenone and its analogues, see Hurd and Shier.

== See also ==
- Mycology
- Foodborne illness
