= Robert L. Buchanan =

American microbiologist

- Education: Rutgers University
- Occupations: Microbiologist and professor
- Employer(s): University of Maryland Center for Food Safety and Security Systems
- Known for: Co-development of the USDA Pathogen Modeling Program
- Website: https://jifsan.umd.edu/about/people/faculty/buchanan

Robert L. Buchanan (born 1946) is a Food scientist and Professor Emeritus at the University of Maryland in the College of Agriculture and Natural Resources. He is a former Director of the University of Maryland's Center for Food Safety and Security Systems. Buchanan co-developed the U.S. Department of Agriculture Pathogen Modeling Program.

== Education ==
Robert Buchanan received his Bachelor's, Master of Science, Master of Philosophy, and Doctoral degrees in Food Science from Rutgers University. He completed post-doctoral training in mycotoxicology at the University of Georgia.

== Career ==
Buchanan has over 30 years experience teaching, conducting research in food safety, and working at the intersection of public health policy and science. He has worked in government service for the U.S. Food and Drug Administration and USDA, as well as in academia. His scientific research areas include predictive microbiology, quantitative microbial risk assessment, microbial physiology, mycotoxicology, and HACCP systems. Buchanan has published 199 documents over the past 40 years.

In 1992, Buchanan and Richard Whiting developed the USDA Microbial Food Safety Pathogen Modeling Program (PMP). The two developed the program as a means of developing a user-friendly software that non-researchers could use, in order to introduce predictive food microbiology to the food industry. The Pathogen Modeling program was updated in 2013.

== Memberships and awards ==
Buchanan has served for 21 years on the International Commission on Microbiological Specifications for Foods. As well as six terms on the National Advisory Committee for Microbiological Criteria for Foods. For 10 years, Dr. Buchanan has also served as the U.S. Delegate to the Codex Alimentarius Committee on Food Hygiene

== Publications ==
- Wang, Yangyang & Buchanan, Robert L. "Develop Mechanistic Models of Transition Periods between Lag/Exponential and Exponential/Stationary Phase", from Procedia Food Science, Volume 7, 2016 p. 163-167
- Buchanan, Robert L., Gorris, Leon G.M., Hayman, Melinda M., Jackson, Timothy C., Whiting, Richard C. "A review of Listeria monocytogenes: An update on outbreaks, virulence, dose-response, ecology, and risk assessments", from Food Control, Volume 75, May 2017, p. 1-13
