= Penicillium ribium =

Scientific classification
- Domain: Eukaryota
- Kingdom: Fungi
- Division: Ascomycota
- Class: Eurotiomycetes
- Order: Eurotiales
- Family: Aspergillaceae
- Genus: Penicillium
- Species: P. ribium

Binomial name
- Penicillium ribium Frisvad, Larsen, Dalsgaard, Seifert, Louis-Seize, Lyhne, Jarvis, Fettinger & Overy 2006

Type strain
- DAOM 234091, IBT 16537, IBT 24431

Species of fungus

Penicillium ribium is a psychrotolerant species of the genus of Penicillium which was isolated from the Rocky Mountains in Wyoming, in the United States. Penicillium ribium produces asperfuran, kojic acid and cycloaspeptide.
