= Aflatoxin total synthesis =

Total synthesis of the group of organic compounds

Chemical structure of aflatoxin B_{1}

Aflatoxin total synthesis concerns the total synthesis of a group of organic compounds called aflatoxins. These compounds occur naturally in several fungi. As with other chemical compound targets in organic chemistry, the organic synthesis of aflatoxins serves various purposes. Traditionally it served to prove the structure of a complex biocompound in addition to evidence obtained from spectroscopy. It also demonstrates new concepts in organic chemistry (reagents, reaction types) and opens the way to molecular derivatives not found in nature. And for practical purposes, a synthetic biocompound is a commercial alternative to isolating the compound from natural resources. Aflatoxins in particular add another dimension because it is suspected that they have been mass-produced in the past from biological sources as part of a biological weapons program.

The synthesis of racemic aflatoxin B1 has been reported by Buechi et al. in 1967 and that of racemic aflatoxin B2 by Roberts et al. in 1968 The group of Barry Trost of Stanford University is responsible for the enantioselective total synthesis of (+)-Aflatoxin B_{1} and B_{2a} in 2003. In 2005 the group of E. J. Corey of Harvard University presented the enantioselective synthesis of Aflatoxin B_{2}.

== Aflatoxin B2 synthesis ==
The total synthesis of Aflatoxin B2 is a multistep sequence that begins with a [2+3]cycloaddition between the quinone 1 and the 2,3-Dihydrofuran. This reaction is catalyzed by a CBS catalyst and is enantioselective. The next step is the orthoformylation of reaction product 2 in a Duff reaction. The hydroxyl group in 3 is esterified with triflic anhydride which adds a triflate protecting group. This step enables a Grignard reaction of the aldehyde group in 4 with methylmagnesiumbromide to the alcohol 5 which is then oxidized with the Dess-Martin periodinane to the ketone 6. A Baeyer-Villiger oxidation converts the ketone to an ester (7) and a reduction with Raney nickel converts the ester into an alcohol and removes the triflic acid group. In the final step the coumarin skeleton is added to 9 by a combined coupling reaction with zinc carbonate of the vinyl bromide in 8 and a transesterification step between the phenol group and the ethyl ester group.

Aflatoxin B2 total synthesis

Aflatoxin B2 total synthesis
