= Aflatoxin =

Group of poisons produced by molds

Chemical structure of aflatoxin B_{1}

Aflatoxins are various poisonous carcinogens and mutagens that are produced by certain molds, especially Aspergillus species such as Aspergillus flavus and Aspergillus parasiticus. According to the USDA, "They are probably the best known and most intensively researched mycotoxins in the world." The fungi grow in soil, decaying vegetation and various staple foodstuffs and commodities such as hay, maize (corn), peanuts, coffee, wheat, millet, sorghum, cassava, rice, chili peppers, cottonseed, tree nuts, sesame seeds, sunflower seeds, and various cereal grains and oil seeds. They have been found in both pet and human foods, as well as in feedstocks for agricultural animals. Animals fed contaminated food can pass aflatoxin transformation products into milk, milk products, and meat. For example, contaminated poultry feed is the suspected source of aflatoxin-contaminated chicken meat and eggs in Pakistan.

Children are particularly vulnerable to aflatoxin exposure, which is linked to immune suppression, stunted growth, delayed development, aflatoxicosis, and liver cancer. Some studies have reported an association between childhood stunting and aflatoxin exposure, although this link has not been consistently detected in all studies. Furthermore, a causal relationship between childhood stunting and aflatoxin exposure has yet to be conclusively shown by epidemiological studies, though such investigations are underway. Adults have a higher tolerance to exposure, but are also at risk. No animal species is known to be immune. Aflatoxins are among the most carcinogenic substances known. After entering the body, aflatoxins may be metabolized by the liver to a reactive epoxide intermediate or hydroxylated to become the less harmful aflatoxin M1.

Aflatoxin poisoning most commonly results from ingestion, but the most toxic aflatoxin compound, B_{1}, can permeate through the skin.

The United States Food and Drug Administration (FDA) action levels for aflatoxin present in food or feed is 20 to 300 ppb. The FDA has had occasion to declare both human and pet food recalls as a precautionary measure to prevent exposure.

The term "aflatoxin" is derived from the name of the species Aspergillus flavus, in which some of the compounds were first discovered. A new disease was identified with unknown characteristics in England during the 1950s and 1960s, which increased turkey mortality. Later, aflatoxin was recognized in 1960 in England as a causative agent of the mysterious Turkey X disease that causes excessive mortality in turkey poults. Aflatoxins form one of the major groupings of mycotoxins.

== Major types and their metabolites ==
Aflatoxin B_{1} is considered the most toxic and is produced by both Aspergillus flavus and Aspergillus parasiticus. Aflatoxin M_{1} is present in the fermentation broth of Aspergillus parasiticus, but it and aflatoxin M_{2} are also produced when an infected liver metabolizes aflatoxin B_{1} and B_{2}.

- Aflatoxin B_{1} and B_{2} (AFB), produced by A. flavus and A. parasiticus
- Aflatoxin G_{1} and G_{2} (AFG), produced by some Group II A. flavus and Aspergillus parasiticus
- Aflatoxin M_{1} (AFM_{1}), metabolite of aflatoxin B_{1} in humans and animals (exposure in ng levels may come from a mother's milk)
- Aflatoxin M_{2}, metabolite of aflatoxin B_{2} in milk of cattle fed on contaminated foods
- Aflatoxicol (AFL): metabolite produced by breaking down the lactone ring
- Aflatoxin Q_{1} (AFQ_{1}), major metabolite of AFB_{1} in in vitro liver preparations of other higher vertebrates

AFM, AFQ, and AFL retain the possibility of becoming an epoxide. Nevertheless, they appear much less capable of causing mutagenesis than the unmetabolized ABM.

== Occurrence ==
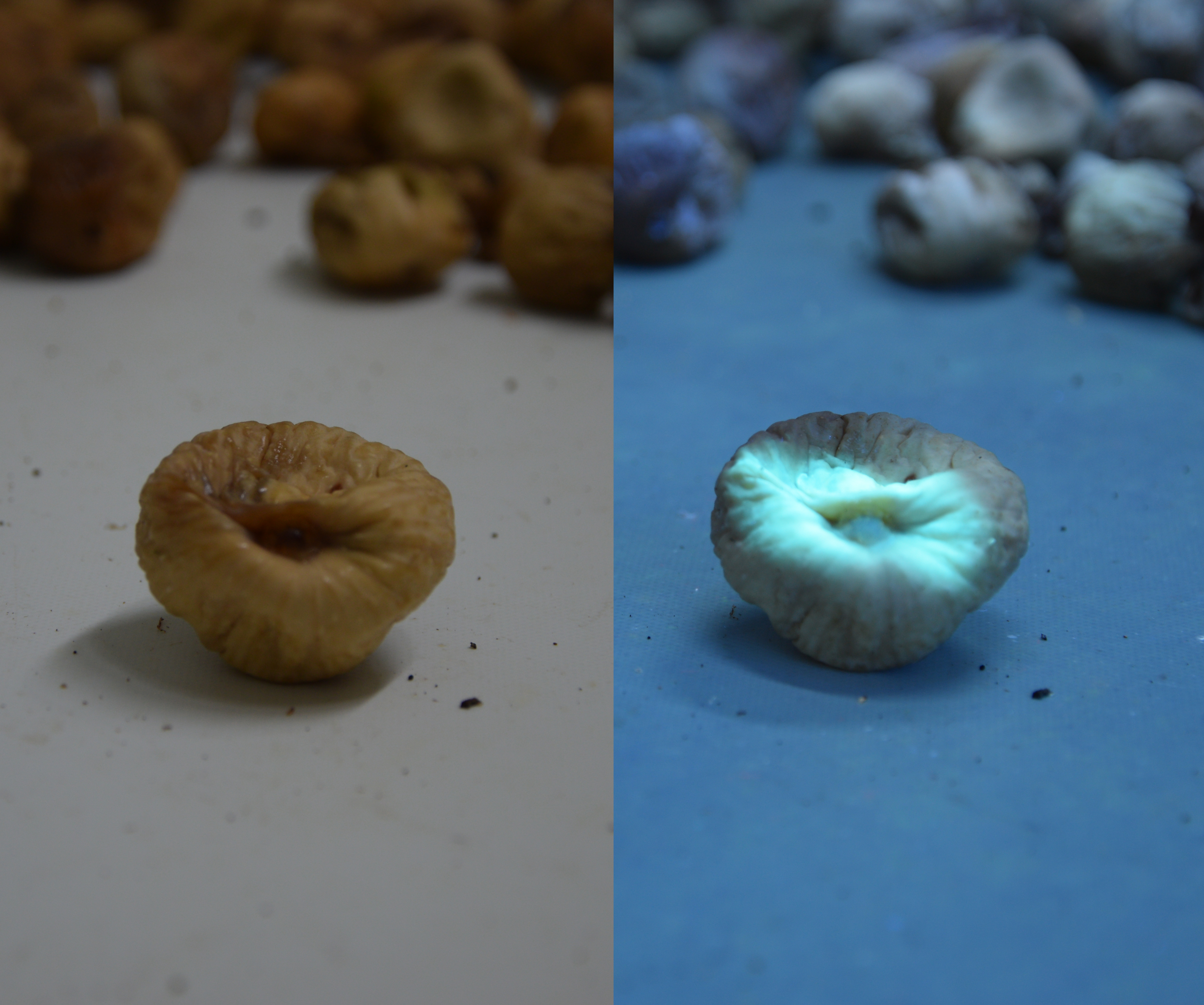
At right, fluorescence emitted under ultraviolet light from fungal growth, which indicates likely presence of aflatoxin. At left, the same fruit under natural light.

The staple commodities regularly contaminated with aflatoxins include cassava, chilies, corn, cottonseed, millet, peanuts, rice, sorghum, sunflower seeds, tree nuts, wheat, and a variety of spices intended for human or animal consumption. Aflatoxins have been isolated from all major cereal crops, and sources as diverse as peanut butter and cannabis. Aflatoxin transformation products are sometimes found in eggs, milk products, and meat when animals are fed contaminated grains.

Aflatoxins are produced by both Aspergillus flavus and Aspergillus parasiticus, which are common forms of "weedy" molds widespread in nature. Aflatoxins occur also in Aspergillus pseudocaelatus, Aspergillus nomius and Aspergillus pseudonomius. The presence of these molds does not always indicate that harmful levels of aflatoxin are present, but it does indicate a significant risk. The molds can colonize and contaminate food before harvest or during storage, especially following prolonged exposure to a high-humidity environment or to stressful conditions such as drought. Aflatoxin contamination is increasing in crops such as maize as a result of climate change.

The native habitat of Aspergillus is in soil, decaying vegetation, hay, and grains undergoing microbiological deterioration, but it invades all types of organic substrates whenever conditions are favorable for its growth. Favorable conditions for production of aflatoxins include high moisture content (at least 7%) and temperatures from 55 to 104 °F (13 to 40 °C), where the optimum is 27 to 30 °C (81 to 86 °F).

A study conducted in Kenya and Mali found that the predominant practices for drying and storage of maize were inadequate in minimizing exposure to aflatoxins.

== Prevention ==
A primary means of limiting risk from aflatoxins in the food supply is food hygiene in the commercial commodity supply chain, such as rejecting moldy grain for use in food processing plants and testing of batches of ingredients for aflatoxin levels before adding them to the mix. Regulatory agencies such as the FDA set limits on acceptable levels. Grain drying itself, which is necessary for viable combine harvesting in many regions, assists in this effort by preventing stored grain from being too damp in the first place.

The use of nixtamalization, the processing of maize or other grains by soaking and cooking in alkali solution, greatly reduces aflatoxin concentrations.

There is very limited evidence to show that agricultural and nutritional education can reduce exposure to aflatoxin in low to middle-income countries.

== Pathology ==
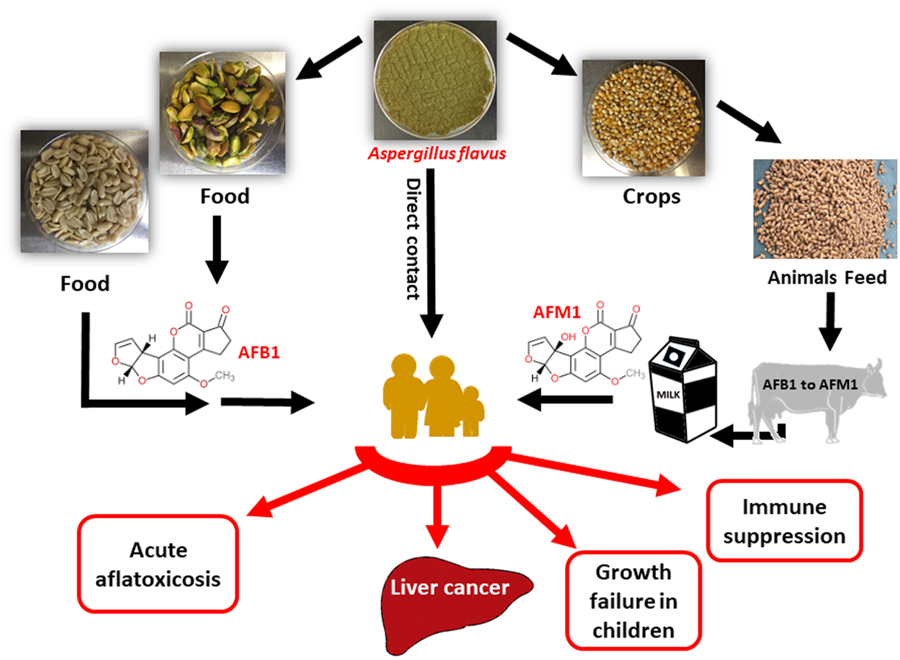
Schematic summarizing the major AFB1 and AFM1 contamination/exposure routes and adverse health effects to human

No animal species is known to be immune to the acute toxic effects of aflatoxins. Adult humans have a high tolerance for aflatoxin exposure and rarely succumb to acute aflatoxicosis, but children are particularly affected, and their exposure can lead to stunted growth and delayed development, in addition to all the symptoms mentioned below.

High-level aflatoxin exposure produces an acute hepatic necrosis (acute aflatoxicosis), resulting later in cirrhosis or carcinoma of the liver. Acute liver failure is made manifest by bleeding, edema, alteration in digestion, changes to the absorption and/or metabolism of nutrients, and mental changes and/or coma.

Chronic, subclinical exposure does not lead to symptoms as dramatic as acute aflatoxicosis. Chronic exposure increases the risk of developing liver and gallbladder cancer, as aflatoxin metabolites may intercalate into DNA and alkylate the bases through its epoxide moiety. This is thought to cause mutations in the p53 gene, an important gene in preventing cell cycle progression when there are DNA mutations, or signaling apoptosis (programmed cell death). These mutations seem to affect some base pair locations more than others; for example, the third base of codon 249 of the p53 gene appears to be more susceptible to aflatoxin-mediated mutations than nearby bases. As with other DNA-alkylating agents, Aflatoxin B_{1} can cause immune suppression, and exposure to it is associated with an increased viral load in HIV positive individuals.

The expression of aflatoxin-related diseases is influenced by factors such as species, age, nutrition, sex, and the possibility of concurrent exposure to other toxins. The main target organ in mammals is the liver, so aflatoxicosis is primarily a hepatic disease. Conditions increasing the likelihood of aflatoxicosis in humans include limited availability of food, environmental conditions that favor mold growth on foodstuffs, and lack of regulatory systems for aflatoxin monitoring and control.

A regular diet including apiaceous vegetables, such as carrots, parsnips, celery, and parsley may reduce the carcinogenic effects of aflatoxin.

There is no specific antidote for aflatoxicosis. Symptomatic and supportive care tailored to the severity of the liver disease may include intravenous fluids with dextrose, active vitamin K, B vitamins, and a restricted, but high-quality protein diet with adequate carbohydrate content.

=== In other animals ===
In dogs, aflatoxin has the potential to lead to liver disease. Low levels of aflatoxin exposure require continuous consumption for several weeks to months for signs of liver dysfunction to appear. Some articles have suggested the toxic level in dog food is 100–300 ppb and requires continuous exposure or consumption for a few weeks to months to develop aflatoxicosis. No information is available to suggest that recovered dogs will later succumb to an aflatoxin-induced disease.

Turkeys are extremely susceptible to aflatoxicosis. Recent studies have revealed that this is due to the efficient cytochrome P450 mediated metabolism of aflatoxin B_{1} in the liver of turkeys and deficient glutathione-S-transferase mediated detoxification.

Some studies on pregnant hamsters showed a significant relationship between exposure to aflatoxin B_{1} (4 mg/kg, single dose) and the appearance of developmental anomalies in their offspring.

== Detection in humans ==
Two principal techniques have been used most often to detect levels of aflatoxin in humans, though they are not commercially available.

The first method is measuring the AFB_{1}-guanine adduct in the urine of subjects. The presence of this breakdown product indicates exposure to aflatoxin B_{1} during the past 24 hours. This technique measures only recent exposure, however. Due to the half-life of this metabolite, the level of AFB_{1}-guanine measured may vary from day to day, based on diet, and it is not ideal for assessing long-term exposure.

Another technique that has been used is a measurement of the AFB_{1}-albumin adduct level in the blood serum. This approach provides a more integrated measure of exposure over several weeks or months.

== Timeline and list of outbreaks ==
- 1960: Outbreak of Turkey 'X' disease in England, and aflatoxin discovery.
- 1961: Identified Aspergillus flavus associated with toxicity of groundnuts.
- 1962: Aflatoxin B and G identified in TLC analysis. Isolation and synthesis of aflatoxins.
- 1963: Aflatoxin B2, G1, and G2 were identified and chemically characterized as difurocoumarin derivatives.
- 1965: FDA approved the first regulation on aflatoxins 30 μg/kg.
- 1966: Milk toxins were designated as AFM1 and AFM2, and AFM1 was detected in milk, urine, kidney, and liver.
- 1973 Poland: 10 died following the opening of the tomb of Casimir IV Jagiellon, which contained aflatoxin-producing molds.
- 2004 Kenya: acute outbreak of aflatoxicosis resulting from ingestion of contaminated maize, 125 confirmed deaths.
- 2005 US: Diamond Pet Foods recalled aflatoxin-contaminated pet food manufactured from corn at their facility in Gaston, South Carolina.
- 2009–2011 International: Commercial peanut butter, cooking oils (e.g. olive, peanut and sesame oil), and cosmetics were identified as contaminated with aflatoxin. In some instances, liquid chromatography–tandem mass spectrometry (LC–MS/MS), and other analytical methods, revealed that 48–80% of selected product samples contained detectable quantities of aflatoxin. In many of these contaminated food products, the aflatoxin exceeded the safe limits of the U.S. Food and Drug Administration (FDA) or other regulatory agencies.
- February–March 2013: Romania, Serbia, Croatia imported into western Europe – 2013 aflatoxin contamination.
- February 2013: Iowa contamination.
- 2014 (ongoing): Nepal and Bangladesh, neonatal exposures, found in umbilical cord blood.
- 2019 Kenya: five brands of maize flour recalled due to contamination.
- 2021 US: Contamination of pet food manufactured by Midwestern Pet Food, causing the deaths of at least 70 dogs.
- 2021 Sri Lanka: contaminated coconut oil released for public consumption by the local government..
- 2023 Makueni County, Kenya: In a cross-sectional study was used to determine the dietary aflatoxin exposure of 170 lactating mothers breastfeeding children aged 6 months and below. This involved the aflatoxin analysis of maize-based cooked food sample which was in their staple foods. Aflatoxins were determined using high-performance liquid chromatography and enzyme-linked immunosorbent assay. About 46% of the mothers were from low-income households, and 48.2% had not attained the basic level of education. A generally low dietary diversity was reported among 54.1% of lactating mothers. Food consumption pattern was skewed towards starchy staples. Approximately 50% never treated their maize, and at least 20% stored their maize in containers that promote aflatoxin contamination. Aflatoxin was detected in 85.4% of food samples. The mean of total aflatoxin was 97.8 μg/kg (standard deviation [SD], 57.7), while aflatoxin B1 was 9.0 μg/kg (SD, 7.7).
- 2024 South Africa: The National Consumer Commission recalled various peanut butter brands due to contamination
- 2012-2024 Kenya: A 13 year study conducted was the evaluation of total aflatoxins and aflatoxins B1 in peanut kernels, peanut butter, cashew nuts, and macadamia nuts. During 2021 to 2024, the Study showed that 59 to 74% of nut samples had exceeded the regulatory limits. However, some improvements were seen.

== See also ==
- Mycotoxins in animal feed
- Sterigmatocystin, a related toxin
- Other ways in which aspergillus can cause disease in mammals:
  - Aspergillosis
  - Primary cutaneous aspergillosis
