= Mycotoxins in animal feed =

Toxin found in animal feed

Mycotoxins are secondary metabolites produced by filamentous fungi, commonly detected as contaminants in agricultural commodities globally. Exposure to these toxins can be very detrimental to both humans and animal, and can lead to mycotoxicosis, which can be a variety of medical conditions. In animals, exposure through feed can disrupt nutrient digestion, absorption, metabolism, and even affect animal physiology. The most common fungi that produce mycotoxins include Fusarium, Aspergillus, and Penicillium.

Some other fungi that are known to produce mycotoxins include Claviceps and Alternaria.

== Effects on animals ==
There are six known types of mycotoxins that affect animals.

Mycotoxin	Fungi	Effect on animals
Aflatoxin	Aspergillus flavus, Aspergillus parasiticus	liver disease, carcinogenic and teratogenic effects
Trichothecenes	Fusarium graminearum, Fusarium sporotrichioides	immunologic effects, hematological changes, digestive disorders, edema
Zearalenone	Fusarium graminearum	estrogenic effects, atrophy of ovaries and testicles, abortion
Ochratoxin	Aspergillus ochraceus, Penicillium verrucosum	nephrotoxicity, mild liver damage, immune suppression
Ergot alkaloid	Claviceps purpurea, Claviceps paspaspali	nervous or gangrenous syndromes
Fumonisin	Fusarium verticillioides, Fusarium proliferatum	pulmonary edema, leukoencephalomalacia, nephrotoxicity, hepatotoxicity

== Effects on feed production ==
The most common mycotoxin is aflatoxin. It can be very carcinogenic to both humans and animals. Aflatoxin is produced by two species of Aspergillus, A. flavus and A. parasiticus, which are known to affect plants including cereal grains, figs, nuts, and tobacco. Cereal grains are one of the main ingredient in animal feed. The animals most at risk of having serious problems with aflatoxins are trout, ducklings, and pigs, while cattle are less at risk.

Ergot alkaloids are associated with grasses that are produced in a structure of Claviceps called the sclerotia. Some of the conditions that result from ergot ingestion in animals include gangrene, abortion, convulsions, hypersensitivity, and ataxia.

Fumonisins were the most recent mycotoxin found to affect humans and animals negatively. The most produced toxin for this group of fungi is fumonisin B1. Studies have shown that it can cause diseases such as equine leukoencephalomalacia in horses, hydrothorax and porcine pulmonary edema in swine, and it can negatively affect the immune system.

Mycotoxins have an immensely detrimental effect on the safety of a variety of animal products and animal by-products while at times being visually undetectable. Varying degrees of mycotoxins such as aflatoxin and zearalenone can be found in eggs produced by chickens with mycotoxin contamination in their feed, but the concentration of mycotoxins and their effect depend on the chicken's diet. Several studies have also found that high concentrations of mycotoxins can be found in the fat regions of the egg yolk. Furthermore, studies from numerous countries have determined that in meat products such as dry-cured ham, sausages and bacon, the mycotoxin ochratoxin A is commonly found and diffuses into the inner layers of the meat. The diffusion occurs when mold resides on the outer surface of meat, allowing for mycotoxins to permeate into the inside of the meat. Consequently, mycotoxins like fumonisins can diminish the meat of an animal by triggering a surge in fat composition while lessening their muscle tissue.

Mycotoxins can be found in well-preserved food products and poorly preserved food substances as contamination can occur in any product based on the circumstances. Notably, there is also a lack of data demonstrating the long-term impact of exposure to mycotoxins through food commodities and due how various mycotoxins can be found in the same product, the toxicity effect on the product and humans is difficult to determine.

== Effects on human health ==
Mycotoxins not only have a substantial impact on the safety of food products and the health of animals, but they can poison those who consume them and cause a wide range of symptoms and diseases in humans. If aflatoxin is ingested, it can advance diseases like Kwashiorkor and Reye's syndrome in children and is considered a strong mutagen, immunosuppressant, and carcinogen. Another mycotoxin, ochratoxin, has carcinogenic and immunosuppressive effects, and can facilitate urinary tract development difficulties. Furthermore, the mycotoxin zearalenone can result in the early puberty of a child if their mother ate food contaminated with zearalenone throughout their pregnancy. Additionally, ergot alkaloids can cause symptoms like indigestion, hallucinations, kidney failure, heart failure and limb numbness in humans. Ultimately, the intensity of the symptoms and the severity of potential diseases are based on age, weight, intensity of toxins, longevity of exposure, diet and therefore can differ from person to person.

== Turkey X disease ==
This disease was the turning point for the use of the term 'mycotoxin'. In the 1960s, about 100,000 turkey poults died in southeastern England due to peanut meal that was contaminated by mycotoxins produced by Aspergillus flavus. It affected turkeys that were two to twenty weeks old, with the highest losses at one month old. It produced neurological symptoms and coma that usually resulted in death.

== Ecosystem and Climate Influences ==
Ecosystem conditions and climate variables play a central role in the growth, distribution, and toxicity of mycotoxin-producing fungi, as these organisms are highly sensitive to environmental factors such as temperature, moisture availability, and atmospheric composition. Rising temperatures and increased atmospheric carbon dioxide concentrations have been associated with enhanced fungal proliferation and, in some cases, increased mycotoxin production in key agricultural commodities such as maize and wheat. Moisture availability, particularly high humidity and water activity, is a critical determinant of fungal colonization and toxin synthesis both in the field and during storage. Weather variability, including droughts, heat waves, and heavy rainfall, has been shown to influence contamination patterns across regions and growing seasons, while environmental stressors such as plant damage and soil disruption can increase crop susceptibility to fungal infection. Climate change is expected to further alter the geographic distribution of mycotoxin-producing fungi, enabling expansion into new regions and crops, while interactions with agricultural practices and post-harvest storage conditions may compound contamination risks along the food supply chain.

== Mycotoxin prevention ==
Studies on mycotoxins show that there are three ways to preventing them from contaminating feed. The first occurs before there is a possibility of fungal infection. The second is when the fungi are starting to produce the toxins. And the final way to prevent contamination is when the material is known to be heavily infected.

Other methods of prevention include planting species that are able to defend naturally against mycotoxins, proper fertilization, weed control, and proper crop rotation. The way the crops are stored after harvesting also plays an important role in staying mycotoxin free. If there is too much moisture then fungi have a better chance of growing and producing mycotoxins. Along with moisture levels, factors such as temperature, grain condition, and the presence of chemical or biologicalcan determine whether or not mycotoxin producing fungi will grow.

Prevention methods can be put into place at storage facilities, transport vehicles and when harvesting due to how mycotoxins can emerge in any phase of the food cultivation and distribution process. The emergence of mycotoxins can be intercepted by harvesting feed products during non-humid seasons as humidity creates a high moisture climate where mycotoxins thrive and minimizing the use of nitrogen rich fertilizers since nitrogen boosts possible mold growth. Mycotoxin infection in animal feed and crops can also be averted through hygienic regulations such as ensuring that sack-stored goods are placed in sanitary sacks with a waterproof layering, sufficient ventilation of the storage location, and the use of safe insecticides and fungicides if insects or mold growth is suspected. Similarly, transport vehicles can be sterile, lack excess moisture, and inhibit extreme temperature changes to deter the development of mycotoxins.

== Policy and Regulatory Considerations ==
Regulatory frameworks for mycotoxins primarily focus on establishing maximum allowable levels for individual toxins in food and feed, with agencies such as the U.S. Food and Drug Administration and international organizations providing guidance, monitoring systems, and risk assessments to limit human exposure. Advanced analytical methods, including liquid chromatography tandem mass spectrometry (LC-MS/MS), are widely used for multi-mycotoxin detection and surveillance across the food supply. However, current policies often do not fully account for the co-occurrence of multiple mycotoxins or their potential additive and synergistic effects, which may underestimate real-world risks. In addition, disparities in regulatory capacity, surveillance infrastructure, and enforcement contribute to uneven protection across regions, with low- and middle-income countries facing greater challenges in mitigation and monitoring. International organizations have emphasized the need for harmonized standards, improved global surveillance systems, and integrated, cross-sectoral approaches that incorporate environmental, agricultural, and public health

== Decontamination of animal feed ==
There are several different methods being used to remove mycotoxins from feed products. One way is the use of adsorbents that bind with the mycotoxins and pull them away from the feed. Another method for decontaminating feed is with the use of activated charcoal in the form of a porous non-soluble powder that can bind with a variety of harmful substances. Activated charcoal is often used to remove other types of toxins or poisoning that have been ingested.
