= Aspergillus nomius =

Scientific classification
- Kingdom: Fungi
- Division: Ascomycota
- Class: Eurotiomycetes
- Order: Eurotiales
- Family: Aspergillaceae
- Genus: Aspergillus
- Species: A. nomius

Binomial name
- Aspergillus nomius Kurtzman, B.W. Horn & Hesseltine (1987)

Species of fungus

Aspergillus nomius is a species of fungus in the genus Aspergillus. It is from the Flavi section. The species was first described in 1987. It has been reported to produce aflatoxin B1, aflatoxin B2, aflatoxin G1, aflatoxin G2, aspergillic acid, kojic acid, nominine, paspaline, pseurotin, and tenuazonic acid. A. nomius has been identified as the cause of human infections.

== Growth and morphology ==
A. nomius has been cultivated on both Czapek yeast extract agar (CYA) plates and Malt Extract Agar Oxoid (MEAOX) plates. The growth morphology of the colonies can be seen in the pictures below.

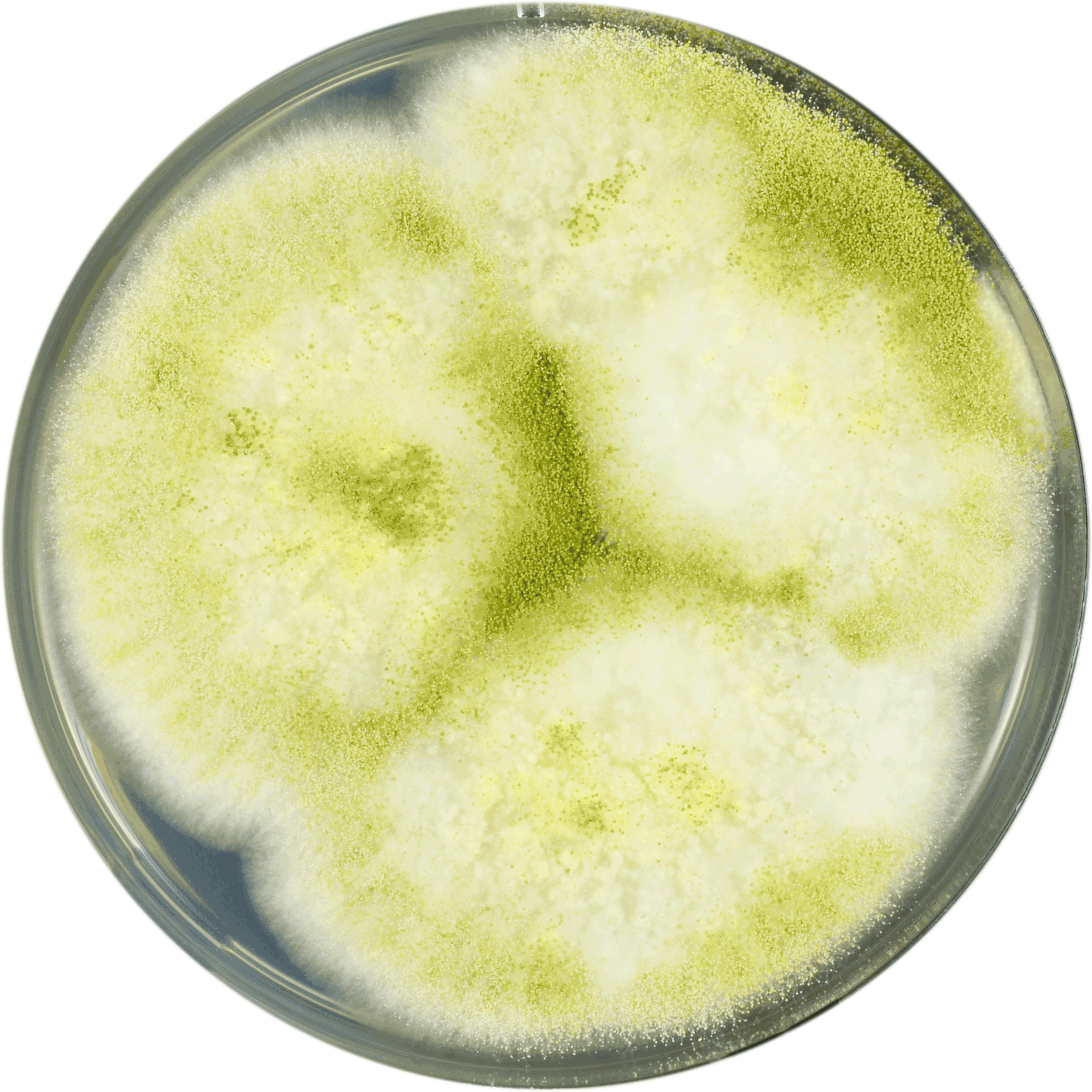
Aspergillus nomius growing on CYA plate

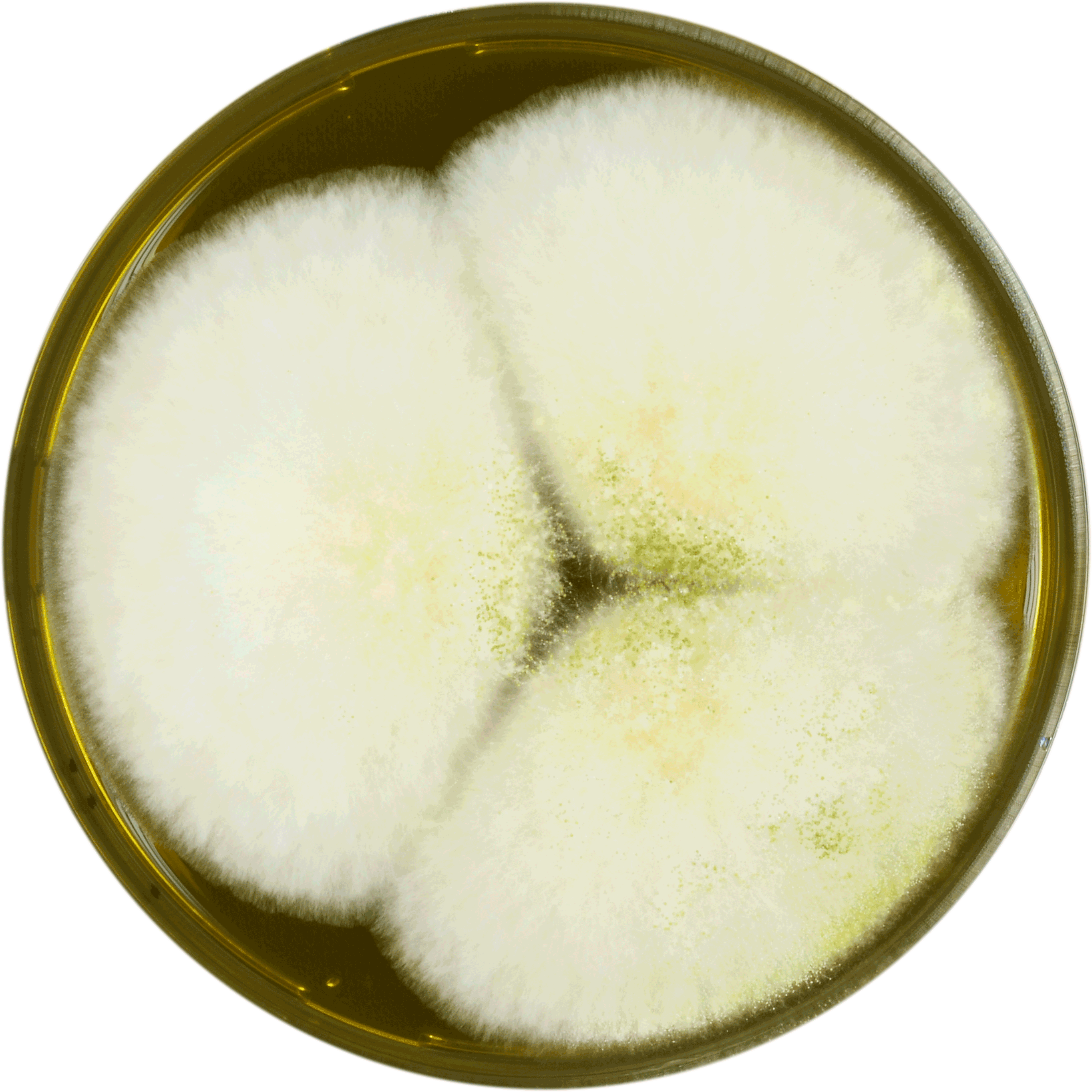
Aspergillus nomius growing on MEAOX plate
