= Aspergillus caelatus =

Scientific classification
- Kingdom: Fungi
- Division: Ascomycota
- Class: Eurotiomycetes
- Order: Eurotiales
- Family: Aspergillaceae
- Genus: Aspergillus
- Species: A. caelatus

Binomial name
- Aspergillus caelatus B.W. Horn (1997)

Species of fungus

Aspergillus caelatus is a species of fungus in the genus Aspergillus. It is from the Flavi section. The species was first described in 1997. It has been isolated from soil in the United States.

== Growth and morphology ==
A. caelatus has been cultivated on both Czapek yeast extract agar (CYA) plates and Malt Extract Agar Oxoid® (MEAOX) plates. The growth morphology of the colonies can be seen in the pictures below.

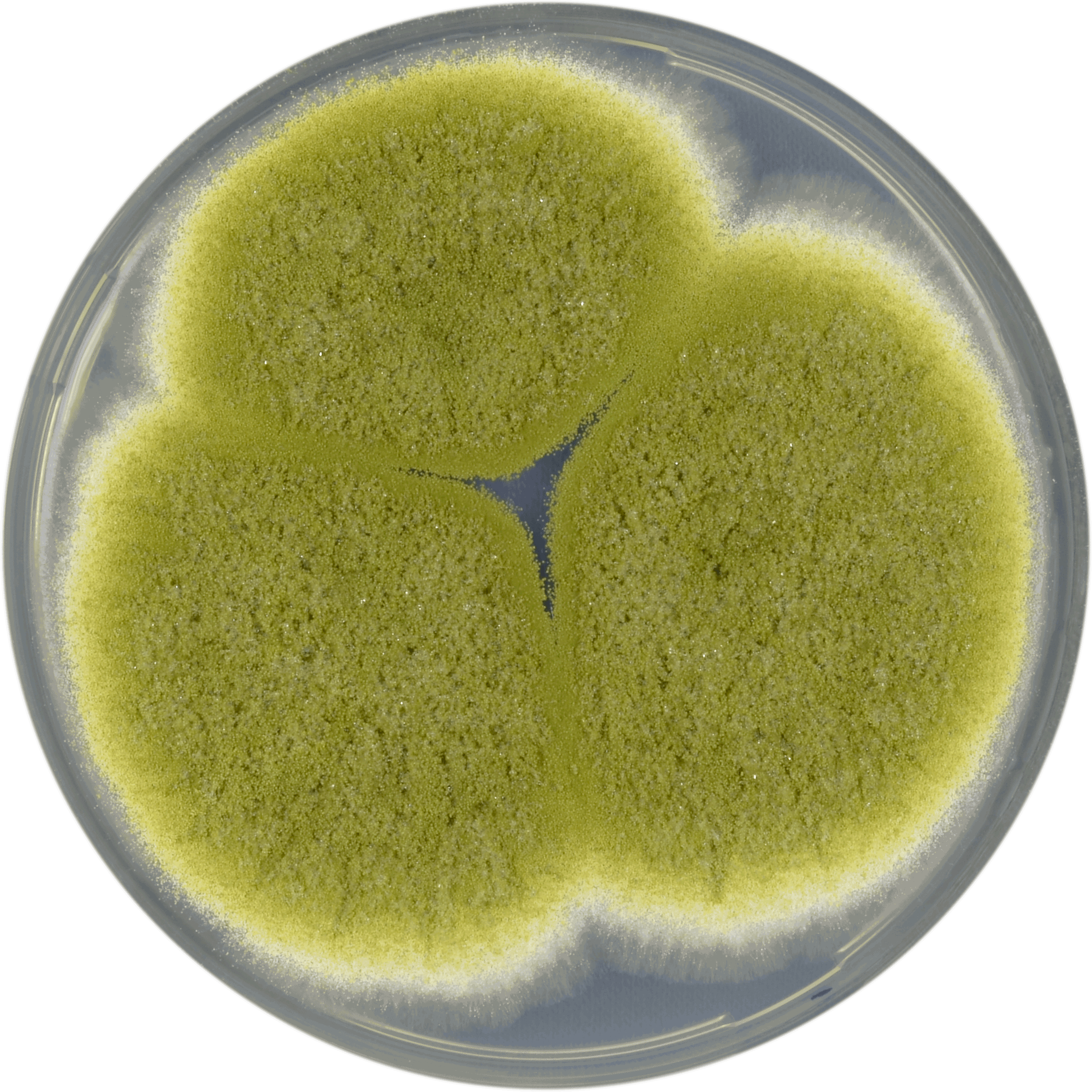
Aspergillus caelatus growing on CYA plate

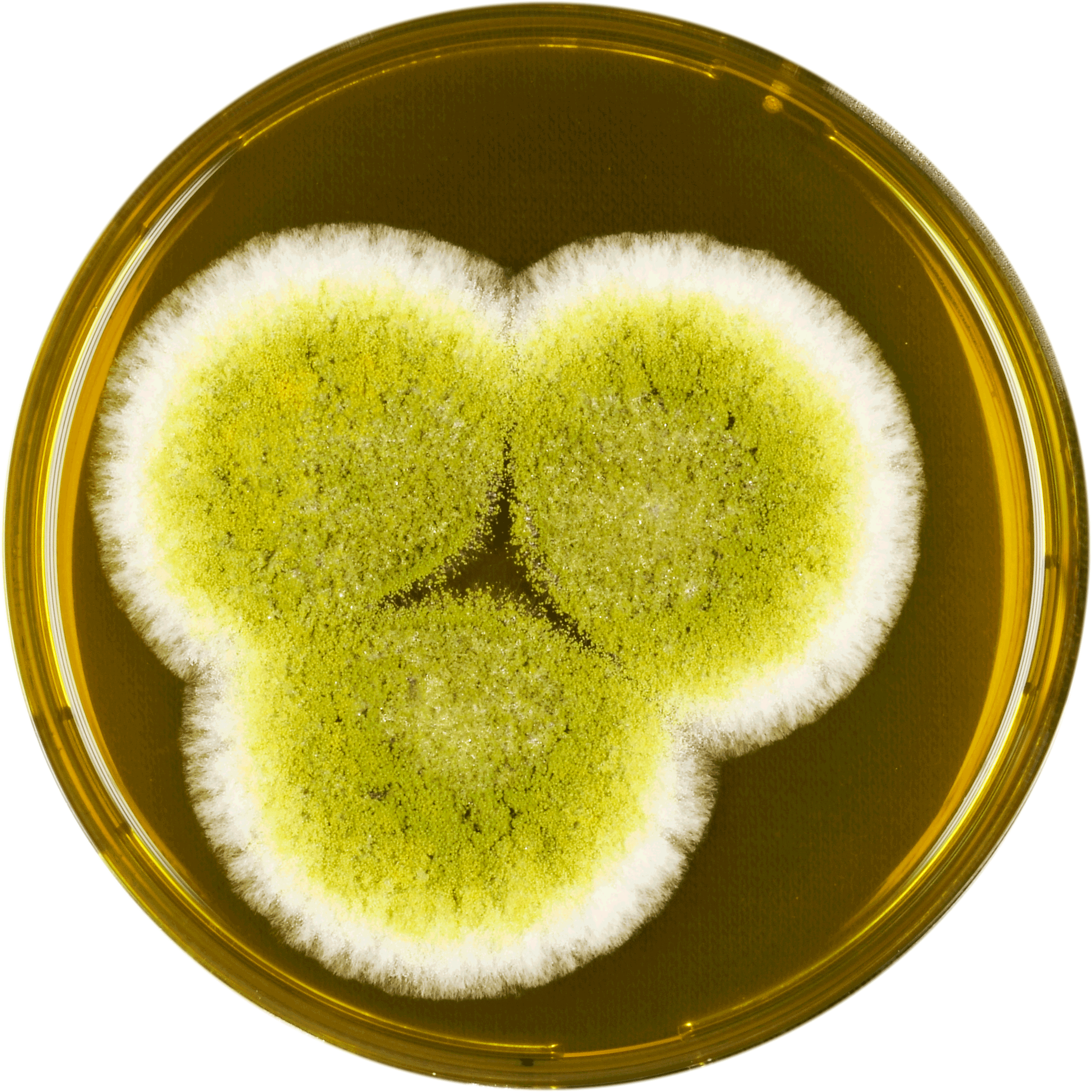
Aspergillus caelatus growing on MEAOX plate
