= Aspergillic acid =

Names
- IUPAC name 6-Butan-2-yl-1-hydroxy-3-(2-methylpropyl)pyrazin-2-one
- Systematic IUPAC name 1-Hydroxy-6-(2-butanyl)-3-isobutyl-2(1H)-pyrazinone
- Other names: 6-sec-Butyl-1-hydroxy-3-isobutyl-2(1H)-pyrazinone; 6-sec-Butyl-3-isobutylpyrazinol 1-oxide; 2-Hydroxy-3-isobutyl-6-(1-methylpropyl)pyrazine 1-oxide; 3-Isobutyl-6-sec-butyl-2-hydroxypyrazine 1-oxide

Identifiers
CAS Number	28696-18-6
3D model (JSmol)	Interactive image
ChEBI	CHEBI:2879
ChEMBL	ChEMBL4297021
ChemSpider	9853
KEGG	C10571
PubChem CID	10272
UNII	2X77I9DEMH
CompTox Dashboard (EPA)	DTXSID10871687 DTXSID80941669, DTXSID10871687
- InChI: InChI=1S/C12H20N2O2/c1-5-9(4)11-7-13-10(6-8(2)3)12(15)14(11)16/h7-9,16H,5-6H2,1-4H3 Key: IUZCDJYHMMWBBE-UHFFFAOYSA-N
- SMILES: CCC(C)C1=CN=C(C(=O)N1O)CC(C)C

Properties
Chemical formula	C_{12}H_{20}N_{2}O_{2}
Molar mass	224.304 g·mol^{−1}
Appearance	Pale yellow needles
Density	1.163 g/cm^{3}
Melting point	98 °C (208 °F; 371 K)
log P	1.7
- Except where otherwise noted, data are given for materials in their standard state (at 25 °C [77 °F], 100 kPa). Infobox references

Aspergillic acid is an organic chemical compound with the molecular formula C_{12}H_{20}N_{2}O_{2}. It has a pale yellow crystalline appearance. Aspergillic acid is most commonly known as an antibiotic and antifungal agent that is derived from certain strains of the fungus Aspergillus flavus.

== History ==
In 1940, Edwin C. White and Justina H. Hill discovered that a fungal strain of Aspergillus flavus growing in a surface culture on a tryptone-salt was capable of producing a bactericidal filtrate. It has also been shown to be a bactericidal for some Gram-negative as well as Gram-positive bacteria. Over the next few years they worked off this discovery and succeeded to isolate the active material in the crystalline form. In 1943 they managed to isolate this antibiotic compound and called it aspergillic acid primarily because of its origin and acidic properties. Scientists have since been working with the Aspergillus flavus strain to produce various types of antibacterial substances.

== Structure ==
The structure of aspergillic acid was identified by Dutcher and Spring and his co-workers. They suggested that it is a cyclic hydroxamic acid related to pyridine. It can be reduced to a neutral deoxyaspergillic acid, which is a racemization product found by Newbold, et al. to be identical with 3-isobutyl-6-sec-butyl-2-hydroxypyrazine. Because of this, aspergillic acid has been assigned the corresponding l-oxide or tautomeric pyridine hydroxamic acid structure show below.

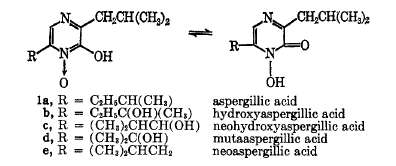

== Toxicity ==
The toxicity of aspergillic acid is controlled by the hydroxamic acid functionality, and there is little effect on toxicity observed between the differences in the 3 and 6 position side chain substituents. Chelation of physiologically important ions, such as calcium by aspergillic acid appears to be the likely mechanism of its toxic action.

== Synthesis ==
Different Aspergillus strains are capable of making various hydroxypyrazine derivatives. Aspergillus flavus is used to produce an antibiotic substance called flavacol. Flavacol is then added to cultures of A. selerotiorum and is N-hydroxylated into neoaspergillic acid. It is then hydroxylated in the side-chain in order to make neohydroxyaspergillic acid

Other studies show that aspergillic acid can also be derived from one molecule of L-leucine and one molecule of L-isoleucine in Aspergillus flavus.

== Reactions ==
When aspergillic acid reactions with iron trichloride (FeCl_{3}), there is the formation of green cupric salt. This suggests that aspergillic acid is a hydroxamic acid derivative, which is also confirmed by the formation of deoxyaspergillic acid by dry distillation with copper chromite catalyst.

Bromination of aspergillic acid followed by reduction with zinc and acetic acid gives a diketopiperazine. Hydrolysis with HBr yields a mixture of DL-leucine and DL-isoleucine. These reaction schemes are presented here below:

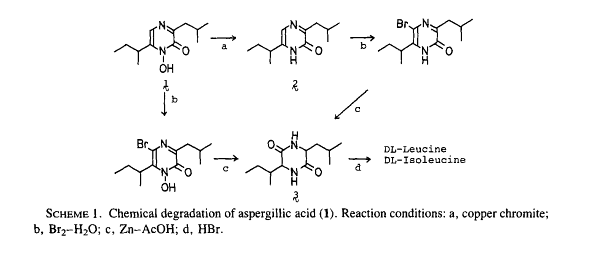
