= Kojic acid =

Names
- Preferred IUPAC name 5-Hydroxy-2-(hydroxymethyl)-4H-pyran-4-one
- Other names Kojic acid, 5-Hydroxy-2-(hydroxymethyl)-4-pyrone, 2-hydroxymethyl-5-hydroxy-γ-pyrone

Identifiers
CAS Number	501-30-4
3D model (JSmol)	Interactive image
Beilstein Reference	120895
ChEBI	CHEBI:43572
ChEMBL	ChEMBL287556
ChemSpider	3708
DrugBank	DB01759
ECHA InfoCard	100.007.203
EC Number	207-922-4
Gmelin Reference	3620
KEGG	C14516
PubChem CID	3840
RTECS number	UQ0875000
UNII	6K23F1TT52
CompTox Dashboard (EPA)	DTXSID2040236
- InChI: InChI=1S/C6H6O4/c7-2-4-1-5(8)6(9)3-10-4/h1,3,7,9H,2H2 Key: BEJNERDRQOWKJM-UHFFFAOYSA-N; InChI=1/C6H6O4/c7-2-4-1-5(8)6(9)3-10-4/h1,3,7,9H,2H2
- SMILES: O=C1/C=C(\O/C=C1/O)CO

Properties
Chemical formula	C_{6}H_{6}O_{4}
Molar mass	142.110 g·mol^{−1}
Appearance	white
Melting point	152 to 155 °C (306 to 311 °F; 425 to 428 K)
Solubility in water	Slight
Acidity (pK_{a})	9.40

Hazards
- GHS labelling
Pictograms	(GHS08: Health hazard)
Signal word	Warning
Hazard statements	H351
Precautionary statements	P201, P280, P308+P313
- Except where otherwise noted, data are given for materials in their standard state (at 25 °C [77 °F], 100 kPa). verify (what is ?) Infobox references

Kojic acid is an organic compound with the formula HOCH_{2}C_{5}H_{2}O_{2}OH. It is a derivative of 4-pyrone that functions in nature as a chelation agent produced by several species of fungus, especially Aspergillus oryzae, which has the Japanese common name koji. Kojic acid is a by-product in the fermentation process of malting rice, for use in the manufacturing of sake, the Japanese rice wine. It is a mild inhibitor of the formation of pigment in plant and animal tissues, and is used in food and cosmetics to preserve or change colors of substances. It forms a bright red complex with ferric ions.

== Biosynthesis ==
^{13}C-Labeling studies have revealed at least two pathways to kojic acid. In the usual route, dehydratase enzymes convert glucose to kojic acid. Pentoses are also viable precursors in which case dihydroxyacetone is invoked as an intermediate.

== Applications ==
Kojic acid may be used on cut fruits to prevent oxidative browning, in seafood to preserve pink and red colors, and in cosmetics to lighten skin.As an example of the latter, it is used to treat skin diseases like melasma. Kojic acid also has antibacterial and antifungal properties. It is also used in the pharmaceutical industry.

It is a precursor to the flavorant maltol.

== Chemical reactions ==
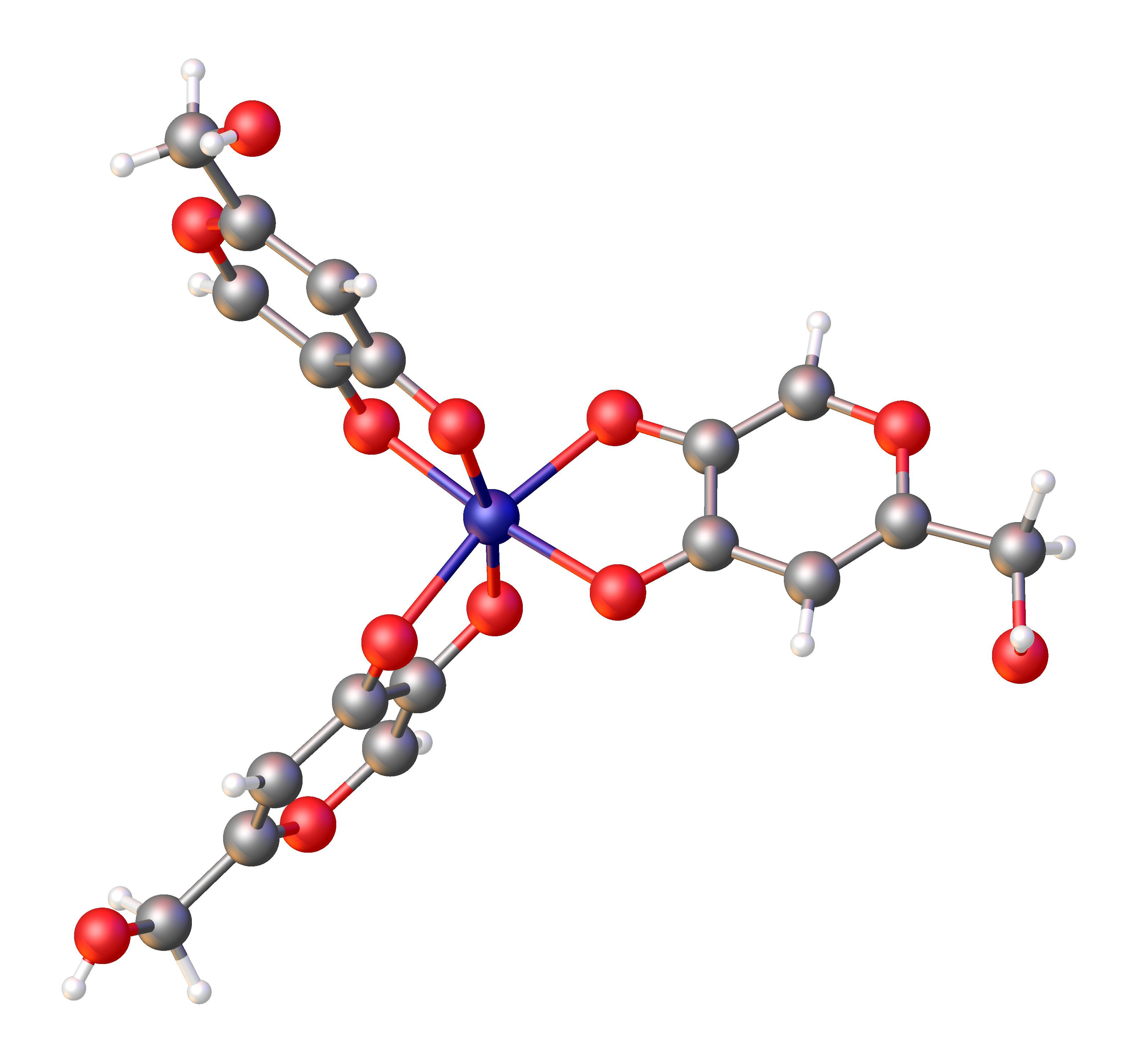
Structure of the coordination complex Fe(kojate)_{3}. Color code: red = O, gray = C, dark blue = Fe, white = H.

Deprotonation of the ring-OH group converts kojic acid to kojate. Kojate chelates to iron(III), forming a red complex Fe(HOCH_{2}C_{5}OH_{2}O_{2})_{3}. This kind of reaction may be the basis of the biological function of kojic acid, that is, to solubilize ferric iron.

Being a multifunctional molecule, kojic acid has diverse organic chemistry. The hydroxymethyl group gives the chloromethyl derivative upon treatment with thionyl chloride. Zinc-reduction of the chloromethyl compound gives allomaltol.

== Safety ==
Kojic acid may be weakly carcinogenic, according to some animal studies. It is not believed to reach carcinogenic thresholds in human skin, and is demonstrably safe at the level used in cosmetics. In the European Union, the cosmetic use of kojic acid is restricted. Under Commission Regulation (EU) 2024/996, it was added to Annex III of the Cosmetics Regulation (EC) No 1223/2009, permitting it only in face and hand products at a maximum concentration of 1%. The limit applies to products placed on the EU market from 1 November 2025.
