= List of Fusarium species =

This is a list of the fungus species in the genus Fusarium. Many are plant pathogens.

As of 2023 August 14, the GBIF lists up to 396 species, while Species Fungorum lists about 440 species. The Encyclopedia of Life lists 213 species. This list is based on the EOL list and was updated with the Species Fungorum list in 2023.

== A ==
- Fusarium aberrans J.W. Xia, L. Lombard, Sand.-Den., X.G. Zhang & Crous (2019)
- Fusarium acaciae-mearnsii O'Donnell, T. Aoki, Kistler & Geiser (2004)
- Fusarium aconidiale L. Lombard & Crous (2021)
- Fusarium acuminatum Ellis & Everh. (1895)
- Fusarium acutatum Nirenberg & O'Donnell (2021)
- Fusarium acutisporum (Sand.-Den. & Crous) O'Donnell, Geiser, Kasson & T. Aoki (2020)
- Fusarium addoense (Sand.-Den. & Guarnaccia) T. Aoki, Geiser & O'Donnell (2021)
- Fusarium aethiopicum O'Donnell, Aberra, Kistler & T. Aoki (2008)
- Fusarium agapanthi O'Donnell, T. Aoki, Jacq. Edwards & Summerell (2016)
- Fusarium aglaonematis Y.X. Zhang, C. Chen & Manawas. (2022)
- Fusarium akasia Lynn & I. Barnes (2021)
- Fusarium albosuccineum (Pat.) O'Donnell & Geiser (2013)
- Fusarium algeriense Laraba & O'Donnell (2017)
- Fusarium alkanophilum Palacios-Prü & V. Marcano (2001)
- Fusarium ambrosium (Gadd & Loos) Agnihothr. & Nirenberg (1990)
- Fusarium amplum (Sand.-Den. & Crous) O'Donnell, Geiser, Kasson & T. Aoki (2020)
- Fusarium ananatum A. Jacobs, Marasas & P.S. van Wyk (2010)
- Fusarium andinum Syd. (1939)
- Fusarium andiyazi Marasas, Rheeder, Lampr., K.A. Zeller & J.F. Leslie (2001)
- Fusarium anguioides Sherb. (1915)
- Fusarium annulatum Bugnic. (1952)
- Fusarium anthophilum (A. Braun) Wollenw. (1916)
- Fusarium arcuatisporum M.M. Wang, Qian Chen & L. Cai (2019)
- Fusarium armeniacum (G.A. Forbes, Windels & L.W. Burgess) L.W. Burgess & Summerell (2000)
- Fusarium arthrosporioides Sherb. (1915)
- Fusarium asiaticum O'Donnell, T. Aoki, Kistler & Geiser (2004)
- Fusarium atrovinosum L. Lombard & Crous (2019)
- Fusarium austroafricanum A. Jacobs, I. Laraba & O'Donnell (2018)
- Fusarium austroamericanum T. Aoki, Kistler, Geiser & O'Donnell (2004)
- Fusarium avenaceum (Fr.) Sacc. (1886)
- Fusarium awan Lynn & I. Barnes (2021)
- Fusarium awaxy Petters-Vandresen, Galli-Terasawa, Terasawa & Glienke (2019)
- Fusarium aywerte (Sangal. & L.W. Burgess) Benyon & L.W. Burgess (2000)
- Fusarium azukiicola T. Aoki, H. Suga, F. Tanaka, Scandiani & O'Donnell (2012)

== B ==
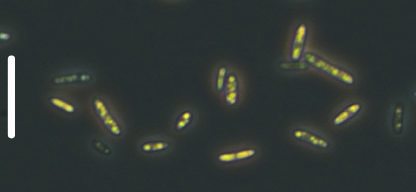
Fusarium brachygibbosum

- Fusarium babinda Summerell, C.A. Rugg & L.W. Burgess (1995)
- Fusarium baccharidicola Henn. (1908)
- Fusarium bacilligerum (Berk. & Broome) Sacc. (1886)
- Fusarium bambusae (Teng) Z.Q. Zeng & W.Y. Zhuang (2017)
- Fusarium bataticola (Sand.-Den. & Crous) O'Donnell, Geiser, Kasson & T. Aoki (2020)
- Fusarium begoniae Nirenberg & O'Donnell (1998)
- Fusarium beomiforme P.E. Nelson, Toussoun & L.W. Burgess (1988)
- Fusarium betae (Desm.) Sacc. (1880)
- Fusarium bicellulare Kirschst. (1941)
- Fusarium bomiense (Z.Q. Zeng & W.Y. Zhuang) O'Donnell, Geiser, Kasson & T. Aoki (2020)
- Fusarium boothii O'Donnell, T. Aoki, Kistler & Geiser (2004)
- Fusarium borneense (Petr.) O'Donnell, Geiser, Kasson & T. Aoki (2020)
- Fusarium bostrycoides Wollenw. & Reinking (1925)
- Fusarium brachiariae M.M. Costa, M.P. Melo, F.S. Carmo & L.H. Pfenning (2021)
- Fusarium brachygibbosum Padwick (1945)
- Fusarium brasilicum T. Aoki, Kistler, Geiser & O'Donnell (2004)
- Fusarium brasiliense T. Aoki & O'Donnell (2005)
- Fusarium breve (Sand.-Den. & Crous) O'Donnell, Geiser, Kasson & T. Aoki (2020)
- Fusarium brevicatenulatum Nirenberg, O'Donnell, Kroschel & Andrianaivo (1998)
- Fusarium brevicaudatum J.W. Xia, L. Lombard, Sand.-Den., X.G. Zhang & Crous (2019)
- Fusarium breviconum (Wollenw.) O'Donnell, Geiser, Kasson & T. Aoki (2020)
- Fusarium bubalinum J.W. Xia, L. Lombard, Sand.-Den., X.G. Zhang & Crous (2019)
- Fusarium bugnicourtii Brayford (1987)
- Fusarium buharicum Jacz. ex Babajan & Teterevn.-Babajan (1929)
- Fusarium bulbicola Nirenberg & O'Donnell (1998)
- Fusarium burgessii M.H. Laurence, Summerell & E.C.Y. Liew (2011)

== C ==
- Fusarium caapi M.M. Costa, M.P. Melo, F.S. Carmo & L.H. Pfenning (2021)
- Fusarium caatingaense A.C.S. Santos, C.S. Lima, P.V. Tiago & N.T. Oliveira (2019)
- Fusarium caeruleum Lib. ex Sacc. (1886)
- Fusarium californicum D.P. Lawr., A. Stack, T.R. Gordon & R.M. Bostock (2020)
- Fusarium callistephi L. Lombard & Crous (2018)
- Fusarium camptoceras Wollenw. & Reinking (1925)
- Fusarium carminascens L. Lombard, Crous & Lampr. (2018)
- Fusarium cartwrightiae Y.P. Tan, Bishop-Hurley, Dhileepan & R.G. Shivas (2023)
- Fusarium casha M. Verm. & Gryzenh. (2021)
- Fusarium cassiae R.H. Perera, E.B.G. Jones & K.D. Hyde (2020)
- Fusarium catenatum (Sand.-Den. & Crous) O'Donnell, Geiser & T. Aoki (2020)
- Fusarium cateniforme J.W. Xia, L. Lombard, Sand.-Den., X.G. Zhang & Crous (2019)
- Fusarium catenulatum F.J. Chen (2000)
- Fusarium caucasicum Letov (1929)
- Fusarium celtidicola Q.J. Shang & K.D. Hyde (2018)
- Fusarium celtis-occidentalis T. Aoki, Geiser & O'Donnell (2021)
- Fusarium chaquense M.J. Nichea, E. Cendoya, S.A. Palacios & M.L. Ramirez (2021)
- Fusarium chinhoyiense Yilmaz & Crous (2021)
- Fusarium chlamydosporum Wollenw. & Reinking (1925)
- Fusarium chuoi R. Hill, Gaya, D.T. Vu, Sand.-Den. & Crous (2021)
- Fusarium cicatricum (Berk.) O'Donnell & Geiser (2013)
- Fusarium circinatum Nirenberg & O'Donnell (1998)
- Fusarium citri M.M. Wang, Qian Chen & L. Cai (2019)
- Fusarium citricola (Guarnaccia & Sand.-Den.) T. Aoki, Geiser & O'Donnell (2021)
- Fusarium clavus J.W. Xia, L. Lombard, Sand.-Den., X.G. Zhang & Crous (2019)
- Fusarium coffeatum L. Lombard & Crous (2019)
- Fusarium coicis Johanssen, J.L. Walsh, M.H. Laurence, L.W. Burgess, E.C.Y. Liew & Petrović (2015)
- Fusarium commune K. Skovg., O'Donnell & Nirenberg (2003)
- Fusarium compactum (Wollenw.) Raillo (1950)
- Fusarium concentricum Nirenberg & O'Donnell (1998)
- Fusarium concolor Reinking (1934)
- Fusarium contaminatum L. Lombard & Crous (2018)
- Fusarium continuum X. Zhou, T. Aoki, O'Donnell & Z.M. Cao (2016)
- Fusarium convolutans Sand.-Den., Crous & W.J. Swart (2018)
- Fusarium coriorum Y.P. Tan & R.G. Shivas (2023)
- Fusarium cortaderiae O'Donnell, T. Aoki, Kistler & Geiser (2004)
- Fusarium crassistipitatum Scandiani, T. Aoki & O'Donnell (2011)
- Fusarium crassum (Sand.-Den. & Crous) O'Donnell, Geiser, Kasson & T. Aoki (2020)
- Fusarium croceum J.W. Xia, L. Lombard, Sand.-Den., X.G. Zhang & Crous (2019)
- Fusarium croci (Guarnaccia, Sand.-Den. & Crous) O'Donnell, Geiser & T. Aoki (2020)
- Fusarium crookwellense L.W. Burgess, P.E. Nelson & Toussoun (1982)
- Fusarium cryptoseptatum (Sand.-Den. & Crous) O'Donnell, Geiser, Kasson & T. Aoki (2020)
- Fusarium cucurbiticola O'Donnell, Geiser, Kasson & T. Aoki (2020)
- Fusarium cugenangense Maryani, L. Lombard, Kema & Crous (2018)
- Fusarium culmorum (Wm.G. Sm.) Sacc. (1892)
- Fusarium cuneirostrum O'Donnell & T. Aoki (2005)
- Fusarium curculicola M. Verm. & Gryzenh. (2021)
- Fusarium curvatum L. Lombard & Crous (2018)
- Fusarium cyanescens (G.A. de Vries, de Hoog & Bruyn) O'Donnell, Geiser & T. Aoki (2020)
- Fusarium cyanostomum (Sacc. & Flageolet) O'Donnell & Geiser (2013)

== D ==
- Fusarium dactylidis T. Aoki, Geiser, P.R. Johnst. & O'Donnell (2015)
- Fusarium denticulatum Nirenberg & O'Donnell (1998)
- Fusarium derridis Henn. (1902)
- Fusarium desaboruense Maryani, Sand.-Den., L. Lombard, Kema & Crous (2019)
- Fusarium desmazieri (De Not. & Becc.) T. Aoki, Geiser & O'Donnell (2021)
- Fusarium devonianum (L. Lombard, Crous & Sand.-Den.) T. Aoki, Geiser & O'Donnell (2021)
- Fusarium dhileepanii Y.P. Tan, Bishop-Hurley & R.G. Shivas (2021)
- Fusarium diminutum (Sand.-Den. & Crous) O'Donnell, Geiser, Kasson & T. Aoki (2020)
- Fusarium dimorphum J.V. Almeida & Sousa da Câmara (1903)
- Fusarium discolor Appel & Wollenw. (1910)
- Fusarium diversisporum Sherb. (1915)
- Fusarium dlaminii Marasas, P.E. Nelson & Toussoun (1986)
- Fusarium dominicanum Cif. (1955)
- Fusarium drepaniforme T. Aoki, Kasson, J.A. Sm., S. Freeman, Geiser & O'Donnell (2021)
- Fusarium duofalcatisporum J.W. Xia, L. Lombard, Sand.-Den., X.G. Zhang & Crous (2019)
- Fusarium duoseptatum Maryani, L. Lombard, Kema & Crous (2018)
- Fusarium duplospermum T. Aoki, Konkol, R.C. Ploetz, J.A. Sm., Kasson, S. Freeman, Geiser & O'Donnell (2021)

== E ==
- Fusarium echinatum Sand.-Den. & G.J. Marais (2021)
- Fusarium eichleri Bres. (1903)
- Fusarium elaeidis L. Lombard & Crous (2018)
- Fusarium elegans Appel & Wollenw. (1910)
- Fusarium elongatum Cooke (1890)
- Fusarium enterolobii P.K.S. Gupta (1974)
- Fusarium epipeda (Quaedvl. & Sand.-Den.) T. Aoki, Geiser & O'Donnel (2021)
- Fusarium equiseti (Corda) Sacc. (1886)
- Fusarium ershadii M. Papizadeh, A. van Diepeningen & H.R. Zamanizadeh (2018)
- Fusarium eucalypticola Henn. (1901)
- Fusarium euonymi Syd. & P. Syd. (1900)
- Fusarium euonymi-japonici Henn. (1902)
- Fusarium euwallaceae S. Freeman, Z. Mendel, T. Aoki & O'Donnell (2014)
- Fusarium expansum Schltdl. (1824)

== F ==
- Fusarium fabacearum L. Lombard, Crous & Lampr. (2019)
- Fusarium falciforme (Carrión) Summerb. & Schroers (2002)
- Fusarium fasciculatum J.W. Xia, L. Lombard, Sand.-Den., X.G. Zhang & Crous (2019)
- Fusarium ferrugineum (Sand.-Den. & Crous) O'Donnell, Geiser, Kasson & T. Aoki (2020)
- Fusarium ficicrescens Al-Hatmi, Mirab., Stielow & de Hoog (2015)
- Fusarium filiferum (Preuss) Wollenw. (1916)
- Fusarium flagelliforme J.W. Xia, L. Lombard, Sand.-Den., X.G. Zhang & Crous (2019)
- Fusarium flavum (Fr.) Wollenw. (1931)
- Fusarium flocciferum Corda (1828)
- Fusarium foetens Schroers, O'Donnell, Baayen & Hooftman (2004)
- Fusarium fracticaudum Herron, Marinc. & M.J. Wingf. (2015)
- Fusarium fractiflexum T. Aoki, O'Donnell & K. Ichik. (2001)
- Fusarium fredkrugeri Sand.-Den., Crous & W.J. Swart (2018)
- Fusarium fructigenum Fr. (1832)
- Fusarium fujikuroi Nirenberg (1976)

== G ==
- Fusarium gaditjirri Phan, L.W. Burgess & Summerell (2004)
- Fusarium gamsii Torbati, Arzanlou & Sand.-Den. (2019)
- Fusarium gamtoosense (Sand.-Den. & Guarnaccia) T. Aoki, Geiser & O'Donnell (2021)
- Fusarium gerlachii T. Aoki, Starkey, L.R. Gale, Kistler & O'Donnell (2007)
- Fusarium gibbosum Appel & Wollenw. (1910)
- Fusarium giganteum M.P. Melo, S.S.C. Guim. & P.G. Cardoso (2021)
- Fusarium globosum Rheeder, Marasas & P.E. Nelson (1996)
- Fusarium glycines L. Lombard, Crous & Lampr. (2018)
- Fusarium glycinicola L. Zhao & J.X. Deng (2021)
- Fusarium goeppertmayeriae Y.P. Tan & R.G. Shivas (2023)
- Fusarium goolgardi D.M. Robinson, M.H. Laurence, E.C.Y. Liew & Summerell (2015)
- Fusarium gossypinum L. Lombard & Crous (2018)
- Fusarium gracilipes J.W. Xia, L. Lombard, Sand.-Den., X.G. Zhang & Crous (2019)
- Fusarium graminearum Schwabe (1839)
- Fusarium graminum Corda (1837)
- Fusarium grosmichelii Maryani, L. Lombard, Kema & Crous (2018)
- Fusarium guilinense M.M. Wang, Qian Chen & L. Cai (2019)

== H ==
- Fusarium haematococcum Nalim, Samuels & Geiser (2011)
- Fusarium hainanense M.M. Wang, Qian Chen & L. Cai (2019)
- Fusarium helgardnirenbergiae O'Donnell, Geiser, Kasson & T. Aoki (2020)
- Fusarium hengyangense (Z.Q. Zeng & W.Y. Zhuang) O'Donnell, Geiser, Kasson & T. Aoki (2020)
- Fusarium heterosporum Nees & T. Nees (1818)
- Fusarium hexaseptatum Maryani, L. Lombard, Kema & Crous (2018)
- Fusarium hibernans Lindau (1909)
- Fusarium hispanicum (Lechat & Priou) T. Aoki, Geiser & O'Donnell (2021)
- Fusarium hoodiae L. Lombard & Crous (2018)
- Fusarium hostae Geiser & Juba (2001)
- Fusarium humi (Reinking) Nirenberg & Hagedorn (2008)
- Fusarium humicola L. Lombard & Crous (2019)
- Fusarium humuli M.M. Wang, Qian Chen & L. Cai (2019)
- Fusarium hypothenemi (Sand.-Den. & Crous) O'Donnell, Geiser, Kasson & T. Aoki (2020)

== I ==
- Fusarium illudens C. Booth (1971)
- Fusarium incarnatum (Desm.) Sacc. (1886)
- Fusarium inflexum R. Schneid. (1975)
- Fusarium ipomoeae M.M. Wang, Qian Chen & L. Cai (2019)
- Fusarium iranicum Torbati, Arzanlou & Sand.-Den. (2019)
- Fusarium irregulare M.M. Wang, Qian Chen & L. Cai (2019)

== J ==
- Fusarium joanfreemaniae Y.P. Tan, Grice, Trevorrow & R.G. Shivas (2023)
- Fusarium juglandicola L. Lombard & Crous (2021)
- Fusarium juglandinum Peck (1909)
- Fusarium juruanum Henn. (1904)

== K ==
- Fusarium kalimantanense Maryani, L. Lombard, Kema & Crous (2018)
- Fusarium kelerajum Samuels, Nalim & Geiser (2011)
- Fusarium keratoplasticum Geiser, O'Donnell, D.P.G. Short & Ning Zhang (2013)
- Fusarium konzum Zeller, Summerell & J.F. Leslie (2003)
- Fusarium kotabaruense Maryani, Sand.-Den., L. Lombard, Kema & Crous (2019)
- Fusarium kurdicum Petr. (1959)
- Fusarium kuroshium (F. Na, J.D. Carrillo & A. Eskalen ex Sand.-Den. & Crous) O'Donnell, Geiser, Kasson & T. Aoki (2020)
- Fusarium kurunegalense Samuels, Nalim & Geiser (2011)
- Fusarium kyushuense O'Donnell & T. Aoki (1998)

== L ==
- Fusarium lacertarum Subrahm. (1983)
- Fusarium lactis Pirotta (1879)
- Fusarium langsethiae Torp & Nirenberg (2004)
- Fusarium languescens L. Lombard & Crous (2018)
- Fusarium laricis Sawada (1950)
- Fusarium lateritium Nees (1816)
- Fusarium lerouxii (Guarnaccia & Sand.-Den.) T. Aoki, Geiser & O'Donnell (2021)
- Fusarium libertatis L. Lombard & Crous (2018)
- Fusarium liriodendri (Sand.-Den. & Crous) O'Donnell, Geiser, Kasson & T. Aoki (2020)
- Fusarium longicaudatum J.W. Xia, L. Lombard, Sand.-Den., X.G. Zhang & Crous (2019)
- Fusarium longicornicola Sand.-Den., Yilmaz & Crous (2021)
- Fusarium longifundum J.W. Xia, L. Lombard, Sand.-Den., X.G. Zhang & Crous (2019)
- Fusarium longipes Wollenw. & Reinking (1925)
- Fusarium longyuwanense T. Aoki, Geiser & O'Donnell (2021)
- Fusarium louisianense L.R. Gale, Kistler, O'Donnell & T. Aoki (2011)
- Fusarium luffae M.M. Wang, Qian Chen & L. Cai (2019)
- Fusarium lumajangense Maryani, Sand.-Den., L. Lombard, Kema & Crous (2019)
- Fusarium lunulosporum Gerlach (1977)
- Fusarium lushanense (J. Luo & W.Y. Zhuang) T. Aoki, Geiser & O'Donnell (2021)
- Fusarium lyarnte J.L. Walsh, Sangal., L.W. Burgess, E.C.Y. Liew & Summerell (2021)

== M ==
- Fusarium macroceras Wollenw. & Reinking (1925)
- Fusarium macrosporum (Sand.-Den., Guarnaccia & Polizzi) O'Donnell, Geiser & T. Aoki (2020)
- Fusarium madaense C.N. Ezekiel, Sand.-Den., Houbraken & Crous (2020)
- Fusarium magnoliae-champaca R.H. Perera, E.B.G. Jones & K.D. Hyde (2020)
- Fusarium mahasenii Samuels, Nalim & Geiser (2011)
- Fusarium makinsoniae Y.P. Tan & R.G. Shivas (2023)
- Fusarium mangiferae Britz, M.J. Wingf. & Marasas (2002)
- Fusarium marasasianum Herron, Marinc. & M.J. Wingf. (2015)
- Fusarium massalimae A.D. Cavalcanti, A.C.S. Santos, J.D.P. Bezerra & O.M.C. Magalhães (2020)
- Fusarium mekan Lynn & I. Barnes (2021)
- Fusarium meridionale T. Aoki, Kistler, Geiser & O'Donnell (2004)
- Fusarium merkxianum (Quaedvl. & Sand.-Den.) T. Aoki, Geiser & O'Donnell (2021)
- Fusarium mesoamericanum T. Aoki, Kistler, Geiser & O'Donnell (2004)
- Fusarium metachroum Appel & Wollenw. (1910)
- Fusarium mexicanum T. Aoki, S. Freeman, Otero-Colina, Rodr.-Alv., Fern.-Pavía, R.C. Ploetz & O'Donnell (2010)
- Fusarium microconidium L. Lombard & Crous (2019)
- Fusarium mindoanum Petr. (1950)
- Fusarium miscanthi W. Gams, Klamer & O'Donnell (1999)
- Fusarium monophialidicum J.W. Xia, L. Lombard, Sand.-Den., X.G. Zhang & Crous (2019)
- Fusarium montanum (Lechat & J. Fourn.) T. Aoki, Geiser & O'Donnell (2021)
- Fusarium mori (Sand.-Den. & Crous) O'Donnell, Geiser, Kasson & T. Aoki (2020)
- Fusarium moronei Curzi (1928)
- Fusarium mucidum J.W. Xia, L. Lombard, Sand.-Den., X.G. Zhang & Crous (2019)
- Fusarium multiceps J.W. Xia, L. Lombard, Sand.-Den., X.G. Zhang & Crous (2019)
- Fusarium mundagurra M.H. Laurence, E.C.Y. Liew, L.A. Shuttlew. & L.W. Burgess (2015)
- Fusarium musae Van Hove, Waalwijk, Munaut, Logrieco & Ant. Moretti (2011)
- Fusarium musarum Logrieco & Marasas (1998)

== N ==
- Fusarium nanum M.M. Wang, Qian Chen & L. Cai (2019)
- Fusarium napiforme Marasas, P.E. Nelson & Rabie (1988)
- Fusarium nectriae-palmicolae not listed -->
- Fusarium neerlandicum (Crous & Sand.-Den.) T. Aoki, Geiser & O'Donnell (2021)
- Fusarium nelsonii Marasas & Logrieco (1998)
- Fusarium neoceras Wollenw. & Reinking (1925)
- Fusarium neocosmosporiellum O'Donnell & Geiser (2013)
- Fusarium neoscirpi J.W. Xia, L. Lombard, Sand.-Den., X.G. Zhang & Crous (2019)
- Fusarium neosemitectum J.W. Xia, L. Lombard, Sand.-Den., X.G. Zhang & Crous (2019)
- Fusarium nepalense T. Aoki, Jon Carter, P. Nicholson, Kistler & O'Donnell (2011)
- Fusarium newnesense M.H. Laurence & Summerell (2015)
- Fusarium ngaiotongaense O'Donnell, Geiser, Kasson & T. Aoki (2020)
- Fusarium nirenbergiae L. Lombard & Crous (2018)
- Fusarium nisikadoi T. Aoki & Nirenberg (1997)
- Fusarium nodosum L. Lombard & Crous (2019)
- Fusarium noneumartii (Sand.-Den. & Crous) O'Donnell, Geiser, Kasson & T. Aoki (2020)
- Fusarium nygamai (Summerell & L.W. Burgess) Benyon, Summerell & L.W. Burgess (2000)

== O ==
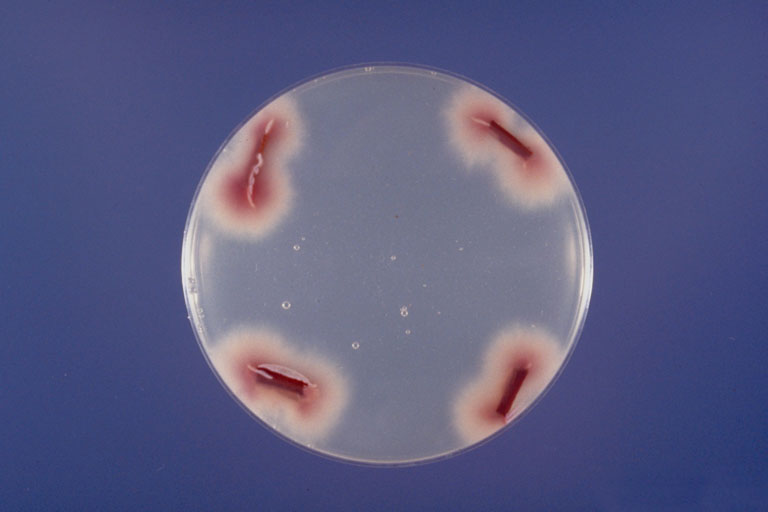
Fusarium oxysporum

- Fusarium oblongum (Sand.-Den. & Crous) O'Donnell, Geiser, Kasson & T. Aoki (2020)
- Fusarium odoratissimum Maryani, L. Lombard, Kema & Crous (2018)
- Fusarium oligoseptatum T. Aoki, M.T. Kasson, S. Freeman, D.M. Geiser & O'Donnell (2018)
- Fusarium ophioides A. Jacobs, T.A. Cout. & Marasas (2021)
- Fusarium ornamentatum (M.A.F. Barbosa) O'Donnell, Geiser & T. Aoki (2020)
- Fusarium oryzae
- Fusarium otomycosis Y.N. Ming & T.F. Yu (1966)
- Fusarium oxysporum Schltdl. (1824)
- Fusarium oxysporum sensu Smith & Swingle

== P ==
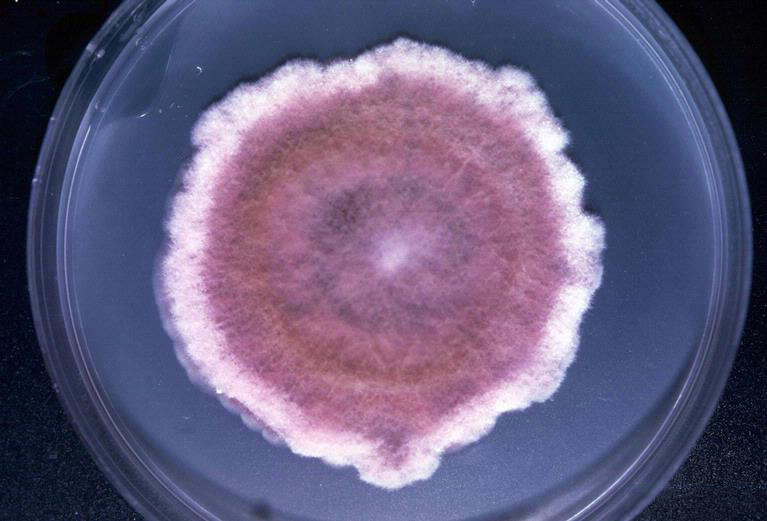
Fusarium poae

- Fusarium pacificum Y.P. Tan & R.G. Shivas (2023)
- Fusarium pallidimors (Tibpromma, Karun., Karasaki & P.E. Mortimer) T. Aoki, Geiser & O'Donnell (2021)
- Fusarium pallidoroseum (Cooke) Sacc. (1886)
- Fusarium palustre W.H. Elmer & Marra (2021)
- Fusarium papillatum T. Aoki, Liyanage, Kasson, J.A. Sm., S. Freeman, Geiser & O'Donnell (2021)
- Fusarium paraeumartii (Sand.-Den. & Crous) O'Donnell, Geiser, Kasson & T. Aoki (2020)
- Fusarium paranaense Costa, Matos & Pfenning (2015)
- Fusarium parceramosum (Sand.-Den. & Crous) O'Donnell, Geiser, Kasson & T. Aoki (2020)
- Fusarium parvisorum Herron, Marinc. & M.J. Wingf. (2015)
- Fusarium paspali Henn. (1905)
- Fusarium paulenelsonii T. Aoki, Geiser & O'Donnell (2021)
- Fusarium peltigerae Westend. (1849)
- Fusarium pentaclethrae Henn. (1905)
- Fusarium pernambucanum A.C.S. Santos, C.S. Lima, P.V. Tiago & N.T. Oliveira (2019)
- Fusarium perseae (Sand.-Den. & Guarnaccia) O'Donnell, Geiser & T. Aoki (2020)
- Fusarium persicinum J.W. Xia, L. Lombard, Sand.-Den., X.G. Zhang & Crous (2019)
- Fusarium peruvianum L. Lombard & Crous (2019)
- Fusarium petersiae L. Lombard (2017)
- Fusarium petroliphilum (Q.T. Chen & X.H. Fu) Geiser, O'Donnell, D.P.G. Short & N. Zhang (2013)
- Fusarium pharetrum L. Lombard & Crous (2018)
- Fusarium phaseoli (Burkh.) T. Aoki & O'Donnell (2003)
- Fusarium phialophorum Maryani, L. Lombard, Kema & Crous (2018)
- Fusarium phyllachorae Henn. (1907)
- Fusarium phyllophilum Nirenberg & O'Donnell (1998)
- Fusarium phyllostachydicola W. Yamam. (1962)
- Fusarium pilosicola Yilmaz, B.D. Wingf. & Crous (2021)
- Fusarium pininemorale Herron, Marinc. & M.J. Wingf. (2015)
- Fusarium piperis (F.C. Albuq.) O'Donnell, Geiser, Kasson & T. Aoki (2020)
- Fusarium plagianthi (Dingley) O'Donnell & Geiser (2013)
- Fusarium poae (Peck) Wollenw. (1913)
- Fusarium polyphialidicum Marasas, P.E. Nelson, Toussoun & P.S. van Wyk (1986)
- Fusarium praegraminearum Gräfenhan & O'Donnell (2016)
- Fusarium prieskaense G.J. Marais & Sand.-Den. (2021)
- Fusarium proliferatum (Matsush.) Nirenberg ex Gerlach & Nirenberg (1982)
- Fusarium protoensiforme (Sand.-Den. & Crous) O'Donnell, Geiser, Kasson & T. Aoki (2020)
- Fusarium pseudensiforme Samuels, Nalim & Geiser (2011)
- Fusarium pseudoanthophilum Nirenberg, O'Donnell & Mubat. (1998)
- Fusarium pseudocircinatum O'Donnell & Nirenberg (1998)
- Fusarium pseudograminearum O'Donnell & T. Aoki (1999)
- Fusarium pseudonygamai O'Donnell & Nirenberg (1998)
- Fusarium pseudopisi (Sand.-Den. & L. Lombard) T. Aoki, Geiser & O'Donnell (2021)
- Fusarium pseudoradicicola (Sand.-Den. & Crous) O'Donnell, Geiser, Kasson & T. Aoki (2020)
- Fusarium pseudotonkinense (Sand.-Den. & Crous) O'Donnell, Geiser, Kasson & T. Aoki (2020)
- Fusarium psidii P.K.S. Gupta (1974)
- Fusarium purpurascens Maryani, L. Lombard, Kema & Crous (2018)
- Fusarium purpureum S.L. Han, M. Raza, W.J. Duan & L. Cai (2023)

== Q ==
- Fusarium queenslandicum T.B. Potter, A.H. Sparks, Vaghefi & R.G. Shivas (2021)
- Fusarium quercinum O'Donnell, Geiser, Kasson & T. Aoki (2020)

== R ==
- Fusarium radicicola O'Donnell & Nirenberg (1998)
- Fusarium ramosum (Bat. & H. Maia) O'Donnell, Geiser & T. Aoki (2020)
- Fusarium rectiphorum Samuels, Nalim & Geiser (2011)
- Fusarium redolens Wollenw. (1913)
- Fusarium regulare (Sand.-Den. & Crous) O'Donnell, Geiser, Kasson & T. Aoki (2020)
- Fusarium reticulatum Mont. (1843)
- Fusarium retusum Wellman (1943)
- Fusarium rhizophorae (Dayar.) O'Donnell, Geiser, Kasson & T. Aoki (2020)
- Fusarium riograndense Dallé Rosa, Ramirez-Castrillón, P. Valente, Fuent., van Diepen. & Goldani (2018)
- Fusarium roseolum (H.O. Stephens ex Berk. & Broome) Sacc. (1886)
- Fusarium rosicola Lin Huang, Jiao He & D.W. Li (2021)
- Fusarium rostratum Appel & Wollenw. (1910)
- Fusarium rubiginosum Appel & Wollenw. (1910)
- Fusarium rusci (Sacc.) O'Donnell & Geiser (2013)
- Fusarium ruscicola (Lechat & J. Fourn.) T. Aoki, Geiser & O'Donnell (2021)
- Fusarium ruthhalliae Y.P. Tan, Bishop-Hurley & R.G. Shivas (2022)

== S ==
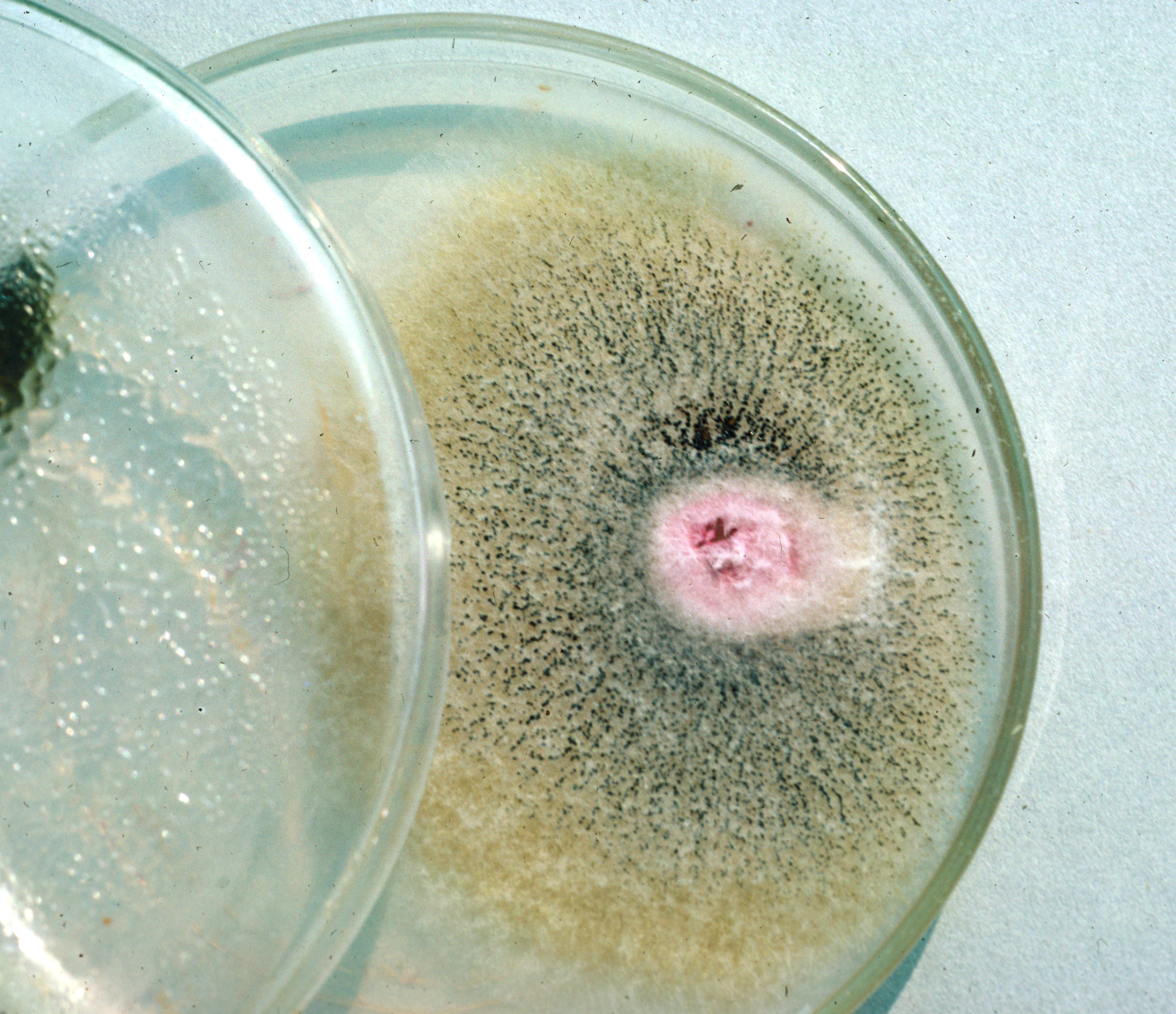
Fusarium subglutinans

- Fusarium sacchari (E.J. Butler) W. Gams (1971)
- Fusarium salinense Sand.-Den., Guarnaccia & Polizzi (2017)
- Fusarium sambucinum Fuckel (1870)
- Fusarium sampaioi Gonz. Frag. (1924)
- Fusarium samuelsii (Sand.-Den. & Crous) O'Donnell, Geiser, Kasson & T. Aoki (2020)
- Fusarium sangayamense Maryani, L. Lombard, Kema & Crous (2018)
- Fusarium sarcochroum (Desm.) Sacc. (1882)
- Fusarium secorum Secor, Rivera-Varas, D.S. Christ, F.M. Mathew, M.F.R. Khan, Varrelm. & M.D. Bolton (2014)
- Fusarium sedimenticola M.M. Wang, F. Liu & L. Cai (2019)
- Fusarium serpentinum J.W. Xia, L. Lombard, Sand.-Den., X.G. Zhang & Crous (2019)
- Fusarium sibiricum Gagkaeva, Burkin, Kononenko, Gavrilova, O'Donnell, T. Aoki & Yli-Mattila (2011)
- Fusarium siculi Sand.-Den., Guarnaccia & Polizzi (2017)
- Fusarium silvicola (Sand.-Den. & Crous) O'Donnell, Geiser, Kasson & T. Aoki (2020)
- Fusarium sinensis Z.H. Zhao & G.Z. Lu (2008)
- Fusarium sinicum (Z.Q. Zeng & W.Y. Zhuang) T. Aoki, Geiser & O'Donnell (2021)
- Fusarium solani (Mart.) Sacc. (1881)
- Fusarium solani-melongenae O'Donnell, Geiser, Kasson & T. Aoki (2020)
- Fusarium sorghi Henn. (1907)
- Fusarium sororula Herron, Marinc. & M.J. Wingf. (2015)
- Fusarium spartum S. Gargouri, V. Balmas, I. Laraba & O'Donnell (2020)
- Fusarium spathulatum (Sand.-Den. & Crous) O'Donnell, Geiser, Kasson & T. Aoki (2020)
- Fusarium sphaerosporum Q.T. Chen & X.H. Fu (1987)
- Fusarium spinosum L. Lombard, Houbraken & Crous (2019)
- Fusarium spinulosum (Pfenning) O'Donnell, Geiser, Kasson & T. Aoki (2020)
- Fusarium sporodochiale L. Lombard & Crous (2019)
- Fusarium sporotrichioides Sherb. (1915)
- Fusarium stercicola Šišić, Al-Hatmi, Baćanović-Šišić, S.A. Ahmed & Finckh (2018)
- Fusarium stilboides Wollenw. (1924)
- Fusarium stromaticola Henn. (1900)
- Fusarium subflagellisporum T.F. Nóbrega & R.W. Barreto (2021)
- Fusarium sublunatum Reinking (1934)
- Fusarium subtropicale C. Pereira, T. Ward & O'Donnell (2018)
- Fusarium subulatum Appel & Wollenw. (1910)
- Fusarium succisae J. Schröt. ex Sacc. (1892)
- Fusarium sudanense S.A. Ahmed, Al-Hatmi & de Hoog (2017)
- Fusarium sulawesiense Maryani, Sand.-Den., L. Lombard, Kema & Crous (2019)
- Fusarium sylviaearleae Y.P. Tan, Bishop-Hurley & R.G. Shivas (2023)

== T ==
- Fusarium tanahbumbuense Maryani, Sand.-Den., L. Lombard, Kema & Crous (2019)
- Fusarium tardichlamydosporum Maryani, L. Lombard, Kema & Crous (2018)
- Fusarium tardicrescens Maryani, L. Lombard, Kema & Crous (2019)
- Fusarium tasmanicum (McAlpine) Rossman (1983)
- Fusarium temperatum Scaufl. & Munaut (2011)
- Fusarium tenuicristatum (S. Ueda & Udagawa) O'Donnell, Geiser & T. Aoki (2020)
- Fusarium terricola Al-Hatmi, S.A. Ahmed & de Hoog (2017)
- Fusarium thapsinum Klittich, J.F. Leslie, P.E. Nelson & Marasas (1997)
- Fusarium theobromae Appel & Strunk (1904)
- Fusarium tjaetaba T.T.H. Vu, J.L. Walsh, M.H. Laurence, L.W. Burgess, E.C.Y. Liew & Summerell (2015)
- Fusarium tjaynera J.L. Walsh, M.H. Laurence, L.W. Burgess, E.C.Y. Liew & Summerell (2015)
- Fusarium torreyae T. Aoki, J.A. Sm., L.L. Mount, Geiser & O'Donnell (2013)
- Fusarium torulosum (Berk. & M.A. Curtis) Nirenberg (1995)
- Fusarium toxicum J.W. Xia, L. Lombard, Sand.-Den., X.G. Zhang & Crous (2019)
- Fusarium transvaalense Sand.-Den., Crous & W.J. Swart (2018)
- Fusarium trichothecioides Wollenw. (1912)
- Fusarium tricinctum (Corda) Sacc. (1886)
- Fusarium triseptatum L. Lombard & Crous (2018)
- Fusarium tritici Erikss. (1891)
- Fusarium tucumaniae T. Aoki, O'Donnell, Yosh. Homma & Lattanzi (2003)
- Fusarium tumidum Sherb. (1928)

== U ==
- Fusarium udum E.J. Butler (1910)
- Fusarium urticearum (Corda) Sacc. (1886)
- Fusarium ussurianum T. Aoki, Gagkaeva, Yli-Mattila, Kistler & O'Donnell (2009)

== V ==
- Fusarium vanettenii O'Donnell, Geiser, Kasson & T. Aoki (2020)
- Fusarium vanleeuwenii Crous & Sand.-Den. (2021)
- Fusarium variasi Lynn & I. Barnes (2021)
- Fusarium vectriae-palmicolae unlisted -->
- Fusarium venenatum Nirenberg (1995)
- Fusarium venezuelense O'Donnell, Geiser, Kasson & T. Aoki (2020)
- Fusarium verrucosum (Pat.) O'Donnell & Geiser (2013)
- Fusarium veterinarium L. Lombard & Crous (2018)
- Fusarium virguliforme O'Donnell & T. Aoki (2003)
- Fusarium vogelii Henn. (1902)
- Fusarium volatile Al-Hatmi, Sand.-Den., S.A. Ahmed & de Hoog (2019)
- Fusarium volutum
- Fusarium vorosii B. Tóth, Varga, Starkey, O'Donnell, H. Suga & T. Aoki (2007)

== W ==
- Fusarium waltergamsii O'Donnell, Geiser & T. Aoki (2020)
- Fusarium warna Lynn & I. Barnes (2021)
- Fusarium wereldwijsianum Crous & Sand.-Den. (2021)
- Fusarium werrikimbe J.L. Walsh, L.W. Burgess, E.C.Y. Liew & B.A. Summerell (2021)
- Fusarium witzenhausenense Šišić, Al-Hatmi, Baćanović-Šišić, S.A. Ahmed & Finckh (2018)
- Fusarium wolgense Rodigin (1942)
- Fusarium wollenweberi Raillo (1950)

== X ==
- Fusarium xiangyunense F. Zhang, X.Y. Yang & K.D. Hyde (2020)
- Fusarium xylarioides Steyaert (1948)
- Fusarium xyrophilum I. Laraba, K.J. Wurdack, Aime & O'Donnell (2019)

== Y ==
- Fusarium yamamotoi O'Donnell, Geiser, Kasson & T. Aoki (2020)

== Z ==
- Fusarium zanthoxyli X. Zhou, T. Aoki, O'Donnell & Z.M. Cao (2016)
