= David M. Geiser =

American mycologist

David M. Geiser (* 1965) is an American mycologist. He is Professor of Mycology and Director of the Fusarium Research Center at Pennsylvania State University.

== Education and career ==
David Geiser received his B.A. in Ecology and Evolutionary Biology from Northwestern University in 1987. He then went on to complete his Ph.D. in Genetics from the University of Georgia in 1995 under the direction of William Timberlake and Michael L. Arnold. His thesis was entitled "Population genetic, chromosomal, and phylogenetic patterns associated with meiosis in Aspergillus. He then went on to complete a postdoctoral fellowship from 1995 to 1998 at the University of California, Berkeley. He is now Professor of Mycology and Director of the Fusarium Research Center at Penn State University.

== Research ==
Geiser's research focuses on the evolution of various fungi, in particular using molecular and genetic information to infer the phylogenetic relationships among various fungi. His group is particularly interested in the evolutionary relationship among Fusarium species, and maintains the world's largest collection of Fusarium cultures.

== Notable publications ==
- O'Donnell K, Sutton DA... Geiser DM (2008). Molecular phylogenetic diversity, multilocus haplotype nomenclature, and in vitro antifungal resistance within the Fusarium solani species complex. Journal of Clinical Microbiology. 46(8): pgs. 2477-2490
- Zhang N, O'Donnell K... Geiser DM (2006). Members of the Fusarium solani species complex that cause infections in both humans and plants are common in the environment. Journal of Clinical Microbiology. 44(6): pgs. 2185-2190
- Geiser DM, Jimenez-Gasco MDM... O'Donnell K (2004). FUSARIUM-ID v 1.0: A DNA sequence database for identifying Fusarium. European Journal of Plant Pathology. 110(5-6): pgs. 473-479
- Geiser DM, Pitt JI, Taylor JW (1998). Cryptic speciation and recombination in the aflatoxin-producing fungus Aspergillus flavus. Proceedings of the National Academy of Sciences. 95(1): pgs. 388-393
