= Monterey County reforestation =

The Monterey County reforestation refers to efforts in Monterey County, California, to preserve the county's pine forests and urban environment. This one county boasts the native Monterey Pine ecosystem; one of the rarest forest ecosystems in the world. Only a few thousand acres of these endemic trees exist in four locations along the Pacific Ocean on the Central Coast of California. The city of Monterey itself maintains more than 19,000 trees in parks and along streets, as well as about 300 acres (1.2 km^{2}) of Monterey Pine forests.

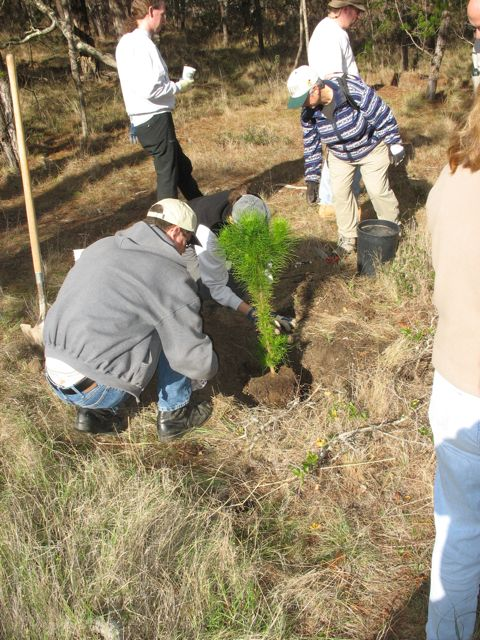
LMP Class of 2008 Reforestation Project

== Pine Forests on the Monterey Peninsula ==
Although the Monterey Pine tree species is widely grown in landscapes and in nurseries throughout Northern America, only a few thousand acres of these trees exist in only four locations; one of these being the Pacific Ocean on the Central Coast of California. The Monterey Peninsula is home to the largest of these stands, but the trees there are threatened by impacts from development, non-native invasive species, and diseases.

The local Monterey Pine forest provides numerous benefits to the region's economy, from its intrinsic beauty that attracts tourists, to recreational settings for residents and visitors, to valuable ecological services, such as watershed protection and enhanced air quality. However, except for a few small sites and the Point Lobos State Reserve, much of the remaining forest is not protected within conservation areas. According to The Monterey Pine Forest Watch, “Half of our native forest has already been removed” and “Much of the remaining forest is in private hands and subject to development.”

=== Urban Forestry ===
Even sites that are protected from tree removal, such as Veteran's Memorial Park, have been impacted by human activities and tree diseases, such as the pine pitch canker. According to Robert Reid, the head of the City of Monterey's Urban Forestry program, the disease was first discovered in 1986, and since then, hundreds of pines of all ages have died and their loss has had a noticeable impact on the forested areas and landscapes of the Peninsula. In the Spring 2007 issue of City Focus, he describes how scientists have been unable to find a cure or stop the spread of the pitch canker fungus: “The infection causes pines to ooze sap, which results in greater susceptibility to attack from destructive pine bark beetles.” The fungus is spread as beetles move from tree to tree.

The local city forestry departments have small staffs, and are charged with the responsibility of caring for large areas of public land. In addition, city tree surgeons are called upon to advise on property issues, construction impacts and risk assessment. The City of Monterey itself maintains more than 19,000 trees, in parks and along streets, and about 300 acres (1.2 km^{2}) of Monterey Pine forests. Monterey currently spends nearly $1 million annually on its urban forestry program, or about $33 per citizen. The City of Carmel spends about $450,000, which with its smaller population translating to about $112 per citizen. An active volunteer group, the Friends of Carmel Forest supports Carmel's tree planting, surveying and educational activities. Carmel's City Council also recently voted to approve a contract with a renowned tree care specialist, Barrie Coates, to provide a study of Carmel's forest. The Council also approved spending up to $50,000 to implement changes recommended by the forest study.

In the City of Monterey, crews trim an average of more than 1,800 trees and remove 150 annually. In 2005, a total of 338 trees were planted or replaced on city property, and 400 native tree seedlings were donated for planting on private property. In addition, the City of Monterey Urban Forestry Section provides tree maintenance services to the Presidio and Naval Postgraduate School. Given the tremendous workload and the importance of the local forests, volunteer groups such as Leadership Monterey Peninsula aid in maintaining and improving the region's quality of life.

== Individual City Information ==
Polled in 2007/8 by the Leadership Monterey Peninsula Reforestation Group, the following is a breakdown of the cities in Monterey County, and their reforestation efforts.

=== City of Monterey ===
Current Forestation Activities:
As of 2008, the City of Monterey has nine employees in the Urban Forestry Department. The City of Monterey works with various volunteer groups to plant trees in high-needs areas; there is also a Neighborhood Improvement Program (NIP) in which residents can request that trees be planted in certain residential areas, such as along the sidewalks. Their budget for tree-planting and maintenance in the city was $1 million, including payroll for nine staff in 2008. This funding comes from taxes and periodic grants, maintenance through the urban forestry department, and volunteers. Historical efforts for this department included spring 2003 stats: 768 on city property, 1500 seedlings donated for planting on private property; average number of trees is 300-500 annually. Others that have assisted in reforestation efforts include Leadership Monterey Peninsula, Boy Scouts of America, and schools that have periodically assisted with tree planting projects, as well as Volunteer Gardener Program – this group tends to do more ornamental and flowers for the city and Monterey Green Action (Yahoo groups) – has volunteers available.

=== City of Carmel ===
Current Forestation Activities:
Carmel's Department of Forest and Beach is responsible for maintenance and improvements to the urban forest. Most of their time is spent pruning, planting, watering, treating insects, and removing dead trees. The city's annual budget for tree-planting and maintenance is $458,000 including beach maintenance and all Forest and Beach Departmental services. This department, encompassing three employees, takes care of all the arboricultural needs of over 13,000 trees growing on public property.

=== City of Marina ===
Current Forestation Activities:
· Marina has been named a "Tree City USA" community by the Arbour Day Foundation.
· It had to meet four standards to get this designation:
· has a tree board or department
· has a community tree ordinance
· has a community forestry programme with an annual budget of at least $2 per capita (budget is $50,554.36; population is 18,824)
· has an Arbour Day Observance and Proclamation (Dec. 17, 2007)

The tree committee has recently been reorganized and is now a subcommittee of the planning commission. Tree planting activities are now done by a non-profit club: the Marina Tree and Garden Club. Their mission is to improve the streets and public areas of the city of Marina, by planting and cultivating trees and gardens therein. This city does not have an arborist or a tree-planting programme.

=== Marina has been named a "Tree City USA" community by the Arbour Day Foundation of Seaside ===
Current Forestation Activities:
There is no reforestation program. The Parks and Recreation Department has an annual budget of approximately $150,000, and has planted over 50+ trees in 2007. A limited number of trees are watered and taken care of by the city park’s department. There is an established relationship with their neighborhood associations to assist with planting of trees within the Seaside.

=== City of Del Rey Oaks ===
Current Forestation Activities: Currently looking for Oak tree donations

=== City of Pacific Grove ===
Current Forestation Activities:
Pacific Grove's tree planting program is called the Trees for Pacific Grove, a public private partnership with this non-profit. In 2007, Trees for PG raised over $10,000 through sponsorships. Individuals can become a Seedling Sponsor for $75 or a Sapling Sponsor for $250. During the same period, Pacific Grove also planted over 1,000 trees and gave away another 500 native trees to local residents to plant on their own property.
Sustainable Pacific Grove is another organization interested in tree planting in Pacific Grove.

== See also ==
- Reforestation
- Monterey, California
- Monterey Bay
- Monterey Peninsula
- Category:Sustainable forest management
- Sustainable forest management

== Bibliographies ==
- Plants. Research conducted in Northern Santa Lucia Mountains, Big Sur, and surrounding areas, 1994-1997. Santa Lucia Natural History Symposium (sponsored by Esalen Institute and University of California Big Creek Reserve. https://web.archive.org/web/20090109000514/http://www.redshift.com/~bigcreek/projects/natural_history/slnhs_bibliography/slm_plants.html
- Selected biological, ecological, and genetic literature relevant to Monterey pine (360 references in alphabetical order by author) / Genetic Resources Conservation Program, University of California
- Technical bibliography on Monterey Pine, Pinus radiata (updated 23 October 1998) / Galen Rathbun, Piedras Blancas Field Station, Western Ecological Research Center, US Geological Survey, San Simeon, CA 93452. https://web.archive.org/web/20110726132013/http://www.greenspacecambria.org/Documents/MontereyPinesBibliography.pdf
