= Fusarium sterilihyphosum =

Scientific classification
- Domain: Eukaryota
- Kingdom: Fungi
- Division: Ascomycota
- Class: Sordariomycetes
- Order: Hypocreales
- Family: Nectriaceae
- Genus: Fusarium
- Species: F. sterilihyphosum

Binomial name
- Fusarium sterilihyphosum Britz, Wingfield & Marasas, 2002

Species of fungus

Fusarium sterilihyphosum is a plant pathogen. It infects mango trees. Its aerial mycelium is almost white; conidiophores on aerial mycelium are erect, occasionally prostrate, and sympodially branched bearing mono- and polyphialides. Phialides on aerial conidiophores mono and polyphialidic. Sterile hyphae are present. Microconidia are obovoid, oval to allantoid, 0-septate conidia are abundant, 1-septate conidia less common. Sporodochia are seldom present. Macroconidia have slightly beaked apical cells, a footlike basal cell, 3–5 septate. Chlamydospores are absent.
