= Fusarium aderholdii =

Scientific classification
- Domain: Eukaryota
- Kingdom: Fungi
- Division: Ascomycota
- Class: Sordariomycetes
- Order: Hypocreales
- Family: Nectriaceae
- Genus: Fusarium
- Species: F. aderholdii

Binomial name
- Fusarium aderholdii Osterwalder 1915

Species of fungus

Fusarium aderholdii is a fungus species of the genus Fusarium.
