= Fusarium acremoniopsis =

Scientific classification
- Domain: Eukaryota
- Kingdom: Fungi
- Division: Ascomycota
- Class: Sordariomycetes
- Order: Hypocreales
- Family: Nectriaceae
- Genus: Fusarium
- Species: F. acremoniopsis

Binomial name
- Fusarium acremoniopsis Vincens 1915

Species of fungus

Fusarium acremoniopsis is a fungus species of the genus Fusarium.
