= Fusarium pseudoanthophilum =

Scientific classification
- Kingdom: Fungi
- Division: Ascomycota
- Class: Sordariomycetes
- Order: Hypocreales
- Family: Nectriaceae
- Genus: Fusarium
- Species: F. pseudoanthophilum

Binomial name
- Fusarium pseudoanthophilum Nirenberg, O'Donnell & Mubat. (1998)

Synonyms
- Fusarium brevicatenulatum Nirenberg, O'Donnell, Kroschel & Andrianaivo (1998)

Species of fungus

Fusarium pseudoanthophilum is a species of fungus in the family Nectriaceae. It was first described by Kerry O'Donnell and Jürgen Kroschel in 1998 as Fusarium brevicatenulatum. It was then listed as a synonym of F. brevicatenulatum by Amata and colleagues in 2010, who confirmed the species are the same through sexual compatibility tests. As of April 2024, Index Fungorum does not recognize the proposed synonymy.

The original 1998 publication included both F. brevicatenulatum and F. pseudoanthophilum. No information was found to locate a type specimen of the species. Research papers noted that F. pseudoanthophilum and F. brevicatenulatum were cultured and isolated from millet, noxious witchweed, and maize. F. pseudoanthophilum was first isolated from Zea mays, maize, in Zimbabwe, Gambiza. F. brevicatenulatum was first isolated from noxious witchweed (Striga asiatica) in Madagascar.

Fusarium in modern Latin comes from the Latin word fusus meaning spindle.

For F. pseudoanthophilum, "pseudo" means false or imitation, "antho" meaning flower, "philum" as friend or loving.

== Physiology ==
Fusarium pseudoanthophilum and F. brevicatenulatum are part of the Gibberella fujikuroi species complex.

=== Fusarium brevicatenulatum ===
The mycelium is whitish and is lanose to fluffy while the pigmentation in reverse is greyish orange and becomes dark bluish-grey. The conidia aggregate in false heads that form short chains. It only forms the short chains under continuous black light. The conidia are long-oval to obovoid and mostly lack septation. There is no odor associated with F. brevicatenulatum.

=== Fusarium pseudoanthophilum ===
The mycelium is orange-white and lanose while the pigmentation in reverse is pale orange and then orange-grey in the center. The conidia are produced in false heads and some also grow short chains. The conidiophores are erect and strongly branched. The condia are obovoid to clavate, pyriform, and sometimes long-oval to alantoid. It is mostly 0-septate. Chlamydospores are produced in chains.

== Studies ==
Isolated from garden soils from Durban, South Africa, F. pseudoanthohilum was among three isolates of Fusarium species present. F. pseudoanthohilum was tested against crops other than the typical associated cereal crops. F. pseudoanthohilum is shown to be able to infect Solanaceae crops such as tomatoes and peppers. F. pseudoanthohilum is also the most susceptible of the Fusarium species to the halogenated coumarins.

An analysis of Fusarium species found in the Kermanshah province of Iran was conducted on the roots and stems of maize between 2006 and 2008. Out of the 110 samples and 1100 Fusarium isolates, 29 Fusarium species were identified. F. pseudoanthohilum and F. brevicatenulatum were among the species. They are the first reports of the species in Iran.

Within the Fusarium species of Gibberella fujikuroi species complex, F. pseudoanthohilum and F. brevicatenulatum were among the 96 fungal isolates of the 28 species studied for furthering data on the production of beauvericin, enniatins, and fusaproliferin and toxicity to Artemia salina, brine shrimp. The studies did not show any of the three F. pseudoanthohilum strains as BEA producers which was previously reported in another study. F. brevicatenulatum was also studied, but there was no significant data that was specifically presented and highlighted.

In Ethiopia, Fusarium species were isolated from maize kernels to analyze what is causing the maize kernel rot. Out of the 200 samples from around Ethiopia, 38% had a mixture of fungal species. F. pseudoanthohilum had a 13.4% association with the kernels compared to the dominant species, F. verticillioides, at 42% out of the 11 different Fusarium species. The maize samples were also tested for mycotoxins. 77% of the total maize samples were found to have fumonisin mycotoxins.

Fusarium pseudoanthohilum were among the pathogenic species isolated from stored potato tubers with symptoms of dry rot disease. 76 species were isolated with a mixture of genera. F. pseudoanthohilum and F. foetens formed a single system with F. oxysporum for their pathogenicity.

== Global Fungi Database ==
In the Global Fungi Database F. brevicatenulatum was used to search as F. pseudoanthophilum was not recognized in the database.

In the Global Fungi database, 74.08% of the samples of F. brevicatenulatum were found in soil. In the entire Global fungi database of the sample type breakdown of all samples, soil was the highest at 44.52%. The sample biome breakdown of the F. brevicatenulatum was 35.84% in cropland, 22.24% in grasslands, and 20.79% in forests. 53.72% of all samples in the entire database were found in forest biomes. The geolocation of the F. brevicatenulatum samples were distributed in Asia at 48.33% and Africa at 31.05%. Based on the map abundance of where the samples are found, F. brevicatenulatum is abundant in South Africa and Eastern Asia.

Croplands and biomes where wild crops are able to grow are preferred, which is typical for the Fusarium genus. Most of the Fusarium are crop related fungi. F. brevicatenulatum and F. pseudoanthophilum were isolated and described on cereal crops.
