= Fusarium sulphureum =

Scientific classification
- Kingdom: Fungi
- Division: Ascomycota
- Class: Sordariomycetes
- Order: Hypocreales
- Family: Nectriaceae
- Genus: Fusarium
- Species: F. sulphureum

Binomial name
- Fusarium sulphureum Schltdl., (1824)

Synonyms
- Fusarium discolor var. sulphureum (Schltdl.) Appel & Wollenw. Fusidium sulphureum (Schltdl.) Link

Species of fungus

Fusarium sulphureum is a fungal plant pathogen infecting maize and hemp.
