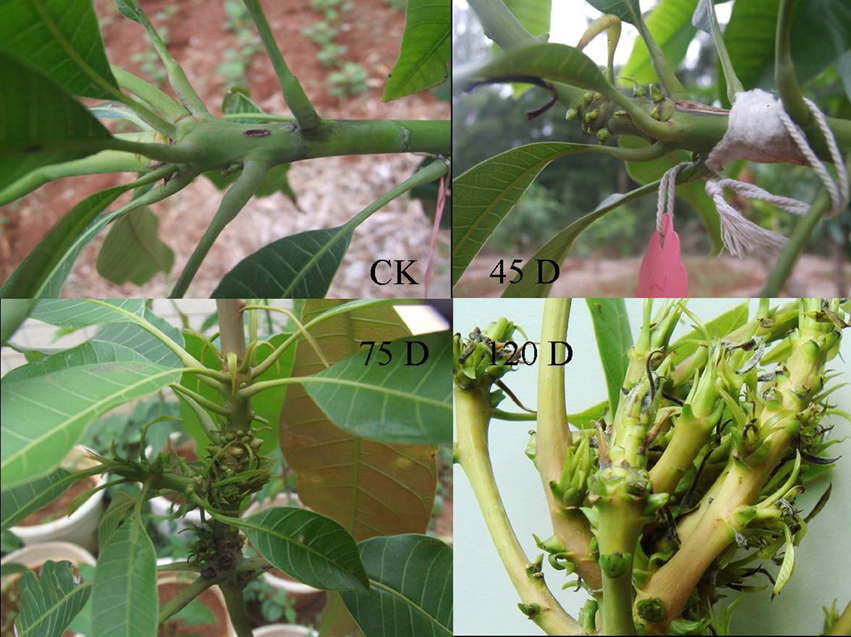

Scientific classification
- Domain: Eukaryota
- Kingdom: Fungi
- Division: Ascomycota
- Class: Sordariomycetes
- Order: Hypocreales
- Family: Nectriaceae
- Genus: Fusarium
- Species: F. mangiferae

Binomial name
- Fusarium mangiferae Britz, Wingfield & Marasas, 2002

= Fusarium mangiferae =

Species of fungus

Fusarium mangiferae is a fungal plant pathogen that infects mango trees. Its aerial mycelium is white and floccose. Conidiophores on aerial mycelium originating erect and prostrate from substrate; they are sympodially branched bearing mono and polyphialides. Polyphialides have 2–5 conidiogenous openings. Phialides on the aerial conidiophores mono- and polyphialidic. Sterile hyphae are absent. Microconidia are variable in shape, obovoid conidia are the most abundant type, oval to allantoid conidia occurring occasionally. Microconidia mostly 0-septate with 1-septate conidia occurring less abundantly. Sporodochia are present. Macroconidia are long and slender, usually 3–5 septate. Chlamydospores are absent.

== Host and symptoms ==
Fusarium mangiferae is one of the causal agents of malformation disease that affects mango (Mangifera indica, L.) growing regions and is economically important. It causes mango malformation disease (MMD) and induces vegetative development abnormalities in shoots that leads to misshaped buds, short internodes, dwarf and narrow leaves. Moreover, MMD causes hormone imbalances in the inflorescence that leads to abnormalities such as an increase in size and numbers, especially for male flowers. They are usually sterile or, if fertilized, abort after fruit set. The malformation of flowers causes a decrease in fruit yields. A Fusarium toxin has been found to play a role in the malformation symptoms on mango. Rootstocks from seedlings used for grafting can also be infected.

== Disease cycle ==
It is an ascomycete that produces mycelia with aerial conidiophores that contain colored structures such as macroconidia with up to five cells, microconidia in false heads and a sporodochium. The epidemiology of the disease is not completely understood and there have been some conflicting reports. Macro and microconidia are produced in live and dead malformed tissues and they are dispersed by wind. Once conidia are dispersed, they will infect primarily the flower and vegetative (apical) buds. Small fruits have also been found to be sources of inoculum in the outer flesh but not the seeds contributing to the spread of the fungus if moved from infected orchards. F. mangiferae can be spread over large distances by material used for propagation of mango. In terms of survival structures, F. mangiferae does not produce chlamydospores and conidia do not survive by itself in soil, only within infected inflorescence. Thus, it is not a typical soil-borne pathogen and Fusarium species.

== Environment ==
Germination of conidia does not occur at low temperatures and high inoculum have been found in summer months. Although inoculum is high during the summer, MMD spreads slowly in orchards due to the sensitivity of conidia to sunlight that impedes their survival.

The fungus spreads primarily by wind but there have been reports of an association with the mango bud mite, Aceria mangiferae, that aids in spread either by wounding that facilitates infection or vectoring conidia. The bud mite could possibly enhance fungal colonization and severity. Humans can also spread the fungus through contaminated tools.

== Management ==
Management of the MMD includes sanitation by removing infected flowers and branches once the disease is established in the orchard. Although it can be time consuming and difficult when the affected trees are large, but it’s an important component for management of disease. Furthermore, using clean nursery stock, no grafting with infected budwood, and decontamination of infected fruit prior to storage or shipping can help to lower disease and spread. Under experimental conditions, sprays with concoctions containing extracts from Datura stramonium, Calotropis gigantea and Azadirachta indica (neem), showed antifungal activity and controlled the malformation symptoms on mango. Chemical control with fungicides is possible but there is no consensus over what chemical is most effective.
