= Fusarium aberrans =

Scientific classification
- Domain: Eukaryota
- Kingdom: Fungi
- Division: Ascomycota
- Class: Sordariomycetes
- Order: Hypocreales
- Family: Nectriaceae
- Genus: Fusarium
- Species: F. aberrans

Binomial name
- Fusarium aberrans J.W. Xia, L. Lombard, Sand.-Den., X.G. Zhang & Crous

Species of fungus

Fusarium aberrans is a fungus species of the genus Fusarium in the Nectriaceae family and Hypocreales order.

It was found on the stems of Oryza australiensis in the Northern Territory of Australia.
