= Fusarium tricinctum =

Scientific classification
- Kingdom: Fungi
- Division: Ascomycota
- Class: Sordariomycetes
- Order: Hypocreales
- Family: Nectriaceae
- Genus: Fusarium
- Species: F. tricinctum

Binomial name
- Fusarium tricinctum (Corda) Sacc., (1886)

Synonyms
- Fusarium citriforme Jamal., Valt. Maatalousk. Julk. 123: 11 (1943); Fusarium sporotrichioides var. tricinctum (Corda) Raillo, Fungi of the Genus Fusarium: 197 (1950); Fusarium sporotrichiella var. tricinctum (Corda) Bilaĭ, Yadovitye griby na zerne khlebnykh zlakov, Kiev: 87 (1953); Fusarium sporotrichiella var. tricinctum (Corda) Bilaĭ, Mikrobiol. Zh. 49(6): 7 (1987); Gibberella tricincta El-Gholl, McRitchie, Schoult. & Ridings, Can. J. Bot. 56(18): 2206 (1978); Selenosporium tricinctum Corda, Icon. fung. (Prague) 2: 7 (1838)

Species of fungus

Fusarium tricinctum is a fungal and plant pathogen of various plant diseases worldwide, especially in temperate regions. It is found on many crops in the world including malt barley (Andersen et al., 1996), and cereals (Chelkowski et al., 1989; Bottalico and Perrone, 2002; Kosiak et al., 2003; and Wiśniewska et al., 2014;).

It is also found on animals such as Rainbow trout, Marasas et al., 1967.

In cereals, it is one of the most common species causes of Fusarium head blight (FHB) and also root rot.
