= Fusarium acutatum =

Scientific classification
- Domain: Eukaryota
- Kingdom: Fungi
- Division: Ascomycota
- Class: Sordariomycetes
- Order: Hypocreales
- Family: Nectriaceae
- Genus: Fusarium
- Species: F. acutatum

Binomial name
- Fusarium acutatum Nirenberg & O'Donnell 1998

Species of fungus

Fusarium acutatum is a fungus species of the genus Fusarium. Fusarium acutatum can cause gangrenous necrosis on the feet from diabetic patients. Fusarium acutatum produces fumonisin B1, fumonisin B2, fumonisin B3 and 8-O-Methyl-fusarubin.
