= Fusarium crookwellense =

Scientific classification
- Domain: Eukaryota
- Kingdom: Fungi
- Division: Ascomycota
- Class: Sordariomycetes
- Order: Hypocreales
- Family: Nectriaceae
- Genus: Fusarium
- Species: F. crookwellense

Binomial name
- Fusarium crookwellense L.W. Burgess, P.E. Nelson & Toussoun, (1982)

Species of fungus

Fusarium crookwellense (syn. Fusarium cerealis) is a species of fungus in the family Nectriaceae. It is known as a plant pathogen that infects agricultural crops.

The fungus was first described in 1982 after it was found infecting potatoes in Australia. It causes plant diseases such as corn ear rot and wheat head blight. It has also been found on hops causing a necrotic blight on the cones.

Like other species in genus Fusarium, this fungus produces mycotoxins. It is a source of nivalenol, 4-acetylnivalenol, and zearalenone.

== See also ==
- List of potato diseases
