= Fusarium acuminatum =

Scientific classification
- Kingdom: Fungi
- Division: Ascomycota
- Class: Sordariomycetes
- Order: Hypocreales
- Family: Nectriaceae
- Genus: Fusarium
- Species: F. acuminatum

Binomial name
- Fusarium acuminatum Ellis & Everh. (1895)

Synonyms
- Fusarium caudatum Wollenw., J. Agric. Res., Washington 2: 262 (1914); Fusarium equiseti var. caudatum (Wollenw.) Joffe, Mycopath. Mycol. appl. 53(1-4): 220 (1974); Fusarium gibbosum var. acuminatum (Ellis & Everh.) Bilaĭ, Fuzarii: 263 (1955); Fusarium gibbosum var. acuminatum (Ellis & Everh.) Bilaĭ, Mikrobiol. Zh. 49(6): 6 (1987); Fusarium scirpi Lambotte & Fautrey, Revue mycol., Toulouse 16(no. 63): 111 (1894); Fusarium scirpi subsp. acuminatum (Ellis & Everh.) Raillo, Fungi of the Genus Fusarium: 177 (1950); Fusarium scirpi var. acuminatum (Ellis & Everh.) Wollenw., Fusaria autographica delineata 3: no. 930 (1930); Fusarium scirpi var. caudatum (Wollenw.) Wollenw., Fusaria autographica delineata 3: no. 934, no. 935 (1930); Fusarium scirpi var. comma Wollenw., Fusaria autographica delineata 3: no. 922 (1930); Fusarium scirpi var. nigrantum F.T. Benn., Ann. appl. Biol. 19: 21-26 (1932); Fusarium scirpi var. pallens F.T. Benn., Ann. appl. Biol. 19: 21-26 (1932); Gibberella acuminata Wollenw., Centbl. Bakt. ParasitKde, Abt. II 106: 190 (1943); Gibberella acuminata C. Booth, The Genus Fusarium: 161 (1971); Microcera acuminata (Ellis & Everh.) Höhn., Sber. Akad. Wiss. Wien, Math.-naturw. Kl., Abt. 1 128: 729 (1919)

Species of fungus

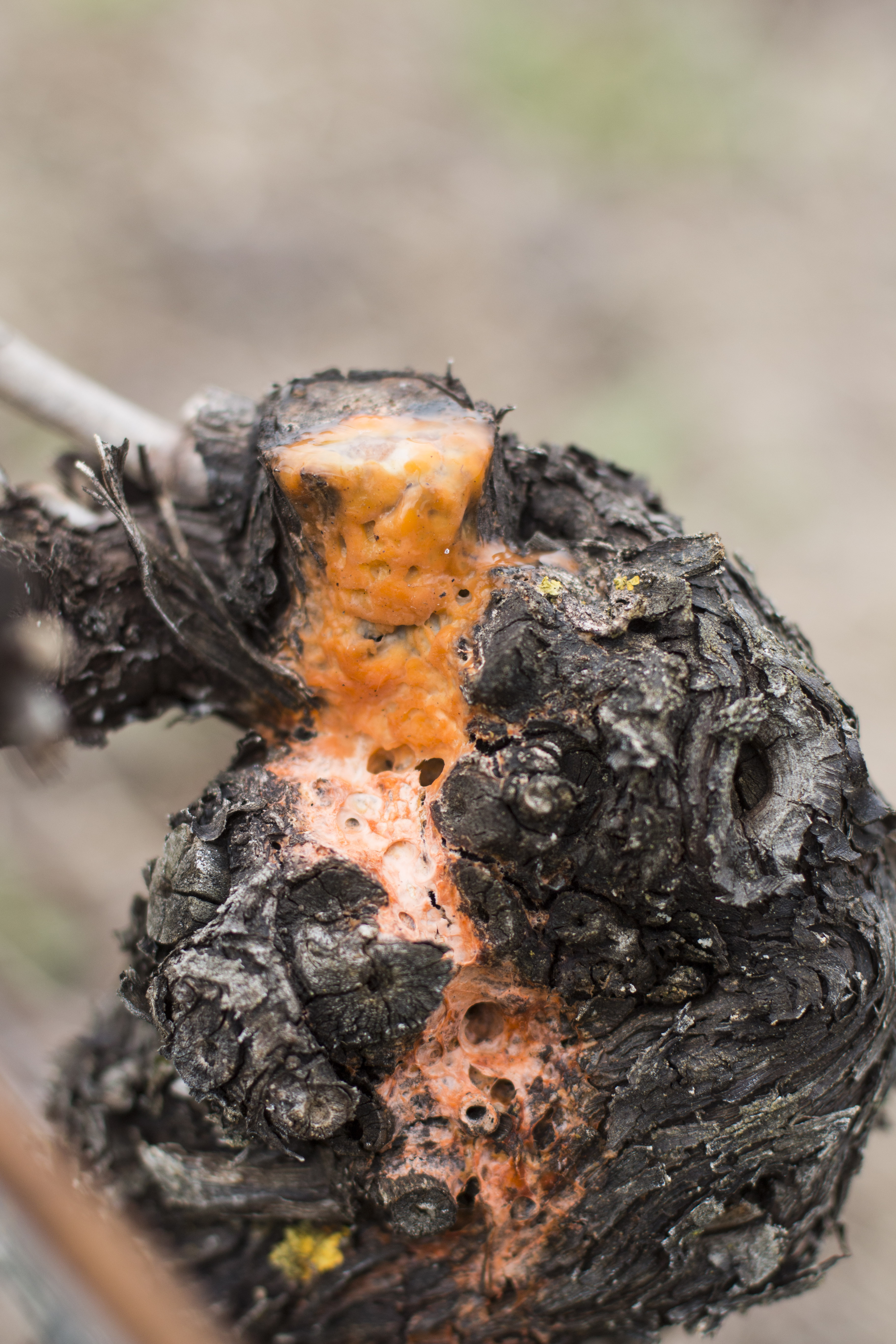
Fusarium acuminatum growing on a grape vine

Fusarium acuminatum is a fungal plant pathogen.

It was originally found on the living stems of Solanum tuberosum in New York, USA.

Fusarium acuminatum has been found to be a ripe rot pathogen of Actinidia chinensis var. deliciosa (fuzzy kiwifruit) in New Zealand.

It has been found to cause post-harvest Rot on stored kiwiberries (Actinidia arguta) in China. It was described as soft, brown, slightly sunken, water-soaked lesions with abundant white-to-pink mycelium. It also causes root rot of Maidong (Ophiopogon japonicus) in China. Fusarium acuminatum and Fusarium solani are known to be major pathogens causing root rot of Astragalus membranaceus (Mongolian milkvetch), which can lead to serious yield loss of the herb in China.
