= Fusarium incarnatum =

Scientific classification
- Domain: Eukaryota
- Kingdom: Fungi
- Division: Ascomycota
- Class: Sordariomycetes
- Order: Hypocreales
- Family: Nectriaceae
- Genus: Fusarium
- Species: F. incarnatum

Binomial name
- Fusarium incarnatum (Desm.) Sacc., (1886)

Synonyms
- Fusarium semitectum Berk. & Ravenel, (1875); Fusarium semitectum var. semitectum Berk. & Ravenel, (1875); Fusisporium incarnatum Desm. Pseudofusarium semitectum (Berk. & Ravenel) Matsush., (1975)

Species of fungus

Fusarium incarnatum is a fungal pathogen in the genus Fusarium, family Nectriaceae. It is usually associated with over 40 phylogenetic species in the natural environment to form the Fusarium incarnatum-equiseti species complex (FIESC). This complex is widespread across the globe in subtropical and temperate regions, resulting in many reported cases of crop diseases. It produces various mycotoxins including trichothecenes zearalenone, causing both plant and animal diseases.

== Taxonomy ==
Throughout the 20th century, many scientists tried to develop a taxonomy and describe species for Fusarium, but they did not achieve global agreement. Starting from the 1990s, DNA evidence helped introduce new Fusarium species, leading to the publication by Leslie and Summerell in 2006, describing 70 species in the genus. Despite continuous efforts, identifying Fusarium incarnatum remained extremely difficult because of its tight association with other fungal and bacterial species.

== Description ==
Under laboratory conditions, Fusarium incarnatum form a cotton-like fungal colony on potato dextrose agar(PDA). It develops intercalary chlamydospore in its hypha, as well as conidiophore and polyphialide-producing macroconidium. The macroconidia has a curved shape with 3-5 septate, with curved and tapering apical cells and foot-shaped basal cells. FIESC usually has a morphologically similar colony to Fusarium incarnatum, with slightly different colors and textures depending on the species in the complex.

== Habitat and distribution ==
Fusarium incarnatum is widely distributed in tropical and temporal regions. Cases have been reported in China, Brazil, and the United States. With different combinations of fungal and bacteria species involved in FIESC, Fusarium incarnatum can be found in soil, plants, and animals, including humans. Its distribution is most tightly related to crop-growing areas. Some common crops Fusarium incarnatum resides in are wheat, rice, barley, and maize.

== Fusarium incarnatum-equiseti species complex ==
The Fusarium incarnatum-equiseti species complex is a species-rich complex formed by the association of more than 40 possible fungi species. They can be distinguished by identifying their secondary metabolites(SM). During the evolutionary processes of FIESC, the portion of the genome contributing to the biosynthesis of SMs remained similar, but the ability to produce SMs is affected by the distribution of gene clusters.

== Pathogen ==
Fusarium incarnatum is a widespread fungal pathogen that severely impacts crop yield in many places in the world. It can also infect animals and humans and is the cause of several diseases. Cases of Fusarium head blight in wheat caused by FIESC have been reported in Mexico. In humans, an implanted polytetrafluoroethylene dialysis graft with Fusarium incarnatum/equiseti has been reported.

The main toxicity of Fusarium incarnatum comes from the mycotoxin produced. Studies have shown that TRI5, TRI8, and TRI11 protein sequences might be responsible for differential trichothecene analogue production in FIESCs. Many fungicides are developed to treat Fusarium, but there is also a risk that drug resistance could be introduced. Phenamacril-resistant mutants of Fusarium incarnatum are easily induced with high resistance levels.

== See also ==
- List of pigeonpea diseases
- List of cucurbit diseases
