= Fusarium redolens =

Scientific classification
- Kingdom: Fungi
- Division: Ascomycota
- Class: Sordariomycetes
- Order: Hypocreales
- Family: Nectriaceae
- Genus: Fusarium
- Species: F. redolens

Binomial name
- Fusarium redolens Wollenw., (1913)

Synonyms
- Fusarium oxysporum var. redolens (Wollenw.) W.L. Gordon, (1952); Fusarium redolens var. solani Sherb., (1915); Fusarium solani var. redolens (Wollenw.) Bilai, (1955); Fusarium redolens var. angustius Lindf. (1917)

Species of fungus

Fusarium redolens is a species of fungus in the genus Fusarium and family Nectriaceae. This species is a soil-borne plant pathogen in temperate prairies. It causes diseases such as root, crown, and spear rot, seedling damping-off, and wilting disease. It is a known producer of the alkaloids peimisine and imperialine-3β-d-glucoside, which has implications for traditional Chinese medicine.

== Taxonomy and phylogenetics ==
Fusarium redolens was described for the first time by Hans Wilhelm Wollenweber in 1913. He originally placed it in the Fusarium section Elegans. All of the members of this group were considered synonymous with Fusarium oxysporum. However, this placing was disputed, and it has since been discovered through gene genealogies that F. redolens does not belong in the Elegans group and F. redolens is not even a sister taxon of F. oxysporum. Fusarium hostae has been found as a sister taxon to F. redolens, and they form a strongly supported clade (100% bootstrap).

== Description ==
=== Mycelium ===
The mycelium of F. redolens is composed of hyphae that have been noted to appear fibrous, powdery, or like "cotton wool." Mycelia can be white, cream, or pink. The central region appears pink and gradually lightens towards the edge where the marginal hyphae are white. F. redolens produces orange and brown pigments in the growth substrate. Colonies have been observed to grow to 75–80 mm in 10 days.

=== Spores ===
F. redolens has conidia and chlamydospores. Conidia are generally smooth, cylindrical, and slightly sickle-shaped. Macroconidia have wider upper cells and hook-shaped end cells. Macroconidia have 3-5 septa and are about 45.9 by 2.58 micrometers in size. Microconidia are oval or cylinder-shaped and are about 10.68 by 3.18 micrometers in size. Chlamydospores are abundant and spherical or oval-shaped, rough-walled, and slightly pigmented.

=== Similarity to F. oxysporum ===
This species' morphology is visually indistinguishable from that of Fusaruim oxysporum. Intermediates also exist between the two species. These species cause similar, at times identical, symptoms in plant hosts and can occur together in infections. Differentiating between the two species is important for the efficient management of their associated diseases through species-specific diagnostics and development of resistant germplasms in hosts. Restriction fragment length polymorphism (RFLP) analysis of the ribosomal DNA (rDNA) internal transcribed spacer (ITS) region is used to differentiate the two. They have four different nucleotides on the 28S gene.

== Distribution and habitat ==
F. redolens inhabits soil primarily in prairies. These prairies are most often in temperate areas. It is able to survive in the soil for years without a plant host. It has a worldwide range and has been isolated in Algeria, Canada, China, Germany, Greece, Italy, Kazakhstan, Lebanon, Morocco, the Netherlands, New Zealand, Pakistan, Poland, South Africa, Spain, Turkey, the United States, and the United Kingdom.

== Pathogenicity ==
Fusarium redolens is a known plant pathogen that can cause a variety of disease symptoms in the host. Recorded plant hosts are Aleppo pine, American ginseng, asparagus, barley, carnation, chickpea, flax, lentil, onion, pea, pelargonium, potato, rose, soybean, spinach, tomato, wheat, and wild rocket. Depending on the host, F. redolens causes root, crown, and/or spear rot, seedling damping-off, and wilt diseases. Symptoms of infection include brown to black necrotic lesions on roots, foliar yellowing, wilting, reduction of emergence, stunting, and rotting of seeds and seedlings. In some cases, seedlings have been found entirely deceased. In plants of the family Poaceae such as barley, heads and spikes are infected as well. It has been noted that it is a weaker pathogen on chickpea, as infections did not kill studied chickpea plants. Three host-specific strains exist and are named accordingly. F. redolens f. sp. Dianthi Gerlach, F. redolens f. sp. Spinaciae (Sherb.) Subramanian, and F. redolens f. sp. asparagi Baayen. While F. redolens causes similar symptoms in plants as Fusarium oxysporum, it is important to differentiate between these species when assessing an infection for contributions towards developing resistant germplasms in target crops.

== Alkaloid production ==
Fusarium redolens is capable of producing alkaline compounds that are similar to its host plant. Most notably, it produces peimisine and imperialine-3β-d-glucoside when inhabiting Fritillaria unibracteata var. wabuensis (FUW) as an endophyte. Both of these compounds are major alkaloids that are found in bulbus Fritillariae cirrhosae (BFC), which is an herb sourced from FUW. BFC has been used in traditional Chinese medicine for over 2000 years to treat respiratory diseases and has a $400 million USD industry surrounding it. BFC is increasingly hard to find due to long-term excessive harvesting. The ability of F. redolens to produce peimisine and imperialine-3β-d-glucoside is highly significant for the development of microbial resources to protect plant resources. However, the capacity of fungi to produce alkaloids is not as high as the host plant, so the fungi are not yet able to be used on an industrial scale.
