= Fusarium sacchari =

Scientific classification
- Domain: Eukaryota
- Kingdom: Fungi
- Division: Ascomycota
- Class: Sordariomycetes
- Order: Hypocreales
- Family: Nectriaceae
- Genus: Fusarium
- Species: F. sacchari

Binomial name
- Fusarium sacchari (E.J. Butler & Hafiz Khan) W. Gams, (1971)

Synonyms
- Cephalosporium sacchari E.J. Butler & Hafiz Khan, (1913); Gibberella moniliformis var. subglutinans Wollenw. & Reinking

Species of fungus

Fusarium sacchari is a fungal and plant pathogen of crops including sugarcane in China.
