= Sudden death syndrome =

Fungal disease of soybean plants

Sudden death syndrome (SDS), a disease in soybean plants, quickly spread across the southern United States in the 1970s, eventually reaching most agricultural areas of the US. SDS is caused by multiple Fusarium fungi in the Fusarium solani complex. Fusarium virguliforme is the sole causal agent in North America. In South America, Fusarium brasiliense, F. cuneirostrum, F. tucumaniae, and F. virguliforme are all causal agents. Losses could exceed hundreds of millions of dollars in US soybean markets alone making it one of the most important diseases found in Soybeans across the US.

== Importance ==
Sudden death syndrome (SDS) has become one of the most impactful yield-reducing diseases in North American soybeans. After making its first appearance in Arkansas in 1971 SDS soon spread to the surrounding states of Tennessee and Mississippi, and then traveled up the Mississippi River to Midwestern states. Currently, the disease affects an area stretching from South Dakota to North Carolina, putting the majority of American soybean producers at risk. The disease has the potential to cause up to 80% yield loss, making it a devastating disease for producers if not detected early and managed correctly. Its presence is currently increasing in northern Midwest states and western Corn Belt states including Minnesota, Nebraska, and Wisconsin, and may coincide with the spread of the Soybean Cyst Nematode (SCN).

== Symptoms and signs ==
Most of the SDS symptoms can be confused with other factors like nutrient deficiencies and some other diseases like brown stem rot and stem canker. Usually the first symptom seen is interveinal chlorosis, which is the yellowing of the plant material between the leaf veins. When leaves begin to die, puckering and mottling can also be observed along with the chlorosis. As severity increases, necrosis (death of cells) occurs and eventually these leaves will fall off, leaving only petioles left on the stem. If the conditions are right (cool and wet), these symptoms can appear suddenly, causing large yield reductions. Normally, this is seen in mid or late July around the time of flowering and pod production.

In addition to foliar symptoms, the stem of the soybean plant can show symptoms as well. If a soybean stem with SDS is split, the pith will be visibly white while the cortical tissue around the pith will be tan to light brown in color. If the pith is brown in color (or if the whole stem looks brown on the inside), it is likely that the plant has brown stem rot, rather than SDS.

Along with the above-ground foliar and stem symptoms, the roots usually show some kind of rotting and decrease in vigor compared to other healthy soybean roots. If soil conditions are moist, roots are also likely to show blue masses of spores (macroconidia) around the taproot just below the soil surface. Blue fungal masses, found along with the foliar and stem symptoms, are strong diagnostic indicators for SDS.

== Disease cycle ==
F. virguliforme overwinters as asexual macroconidium and chlamydospores and currently, no research has found a successful sexual stage with this pathogen. When conditions are favorable, these spores germinate on seedling roots and infect the plant. From the V1 to R1 stages (seedling to first flower) of soybean growth, the fungus colonizes within the plant cortex and only goes up the stem a few inches above the soil surface. Toxins are produced when the pathogen colonizes the lower parts of the soybean cortex. These toxins travel up the xylem to the leaves, causing leaf chlorosis and necrosis, eventually leading to leaf and pod drop.

Blue Fungal spore masses are produced on the roots of the plant where macroconidia are formed. Macroconidia are one of the overwintering phases of the pathogen and can persist in the soil and plant residue for many years. Between growing seasons, F. virguliforme is also found in the form of chlamydospores in the crop residue and freely in the soil. These thick-walled overwintering structures can withstand large temperature fluctuations within the soil and even resist desiccation.

There is no known sexual reproduction in certain SDS causal agents such as F. virguliforme. However, F. tucumaniae has recently been shown to produce perithecia, a sexual fruiting body, which provides evidence for the existence of a sexual reproduction cycle in that species.

== Environmental factors ==
Cool and wet soil is the most ideal condition for F. virguliforme, the pathogen that causes SDS. The presence of the disease is often able to be tracked with storm fronts moving across the country. Symptoms of SDS are usually common 10–14 days after heavy rains. While the disease prefers cool soil, symptoms often do not manifest themselves until July or August after a soaking rain saturates the soil. Early planting can leave seeds susceptible to SDS, as can planting vulnerable varieties. SCN infection of a population of plants also creates a favorable environment for SDS, as the roots of the plants are already under stress from the nematode, leaving them vulnerable to infection from F. virguliforme. The presence of SCN is also one of the most important environmental factors for SDS. Limiting soybean exposure to SCN is much easier in comparison to SDS, so limiting a field's vulnerability to SCN is vital to preventing the introduction of SDS. Additionally, SDS has been shown to be more severe in highly fertile soils, specifically those with high phosphorus, magnesium, and organic matter. Environmental factors are some of the largest variables that will determine both the presence and severity of an SDS infection. The ability to control and react to as many of these factors as possible is key to protecting a soybean crop from SDS.

== Disease development ==
F. virguliforme is a soil-borne pathogen that starts by infecting the roots of soybean seedlings after germination. The fungus then moves up the plant and infects the vascular tissue, causing a brown color within the cortex around the pith of the plant a few inches above the soil surface. Toxins are produced by the fungus when it colonizes the cortex and are sent up the stem to the leaves, causing the above-ground symptoms around first flower during mid-summer. While infection occurs early in the season, symptoms do not normally appear until mid-summer.

SDS also has a synergistic relationship with Soybean Cyst Nematode (SCN). Fields that have SCN presence have more severe SDS symptoms. While it is not known exactly how the two interact, it is known that symptoms of SDS are more severe when SCN are present in the field and that F. virguliforme can be isolated from an SCN that is found in the same area as this pathogen.

== Management ==
-Plant resistant cultivars: Planting SDS resistant cultivars is likely the most reliable way to prevent SDS infection of a soybean crop. Previously, finding SDS resistant soybean varieties had been fairly difficult to find, and were fairly expensive. However, as the prevalence of SDS in high soybean production areas has increased, seed companies have begun to develop more varieties resistant to F. veruguliforme and SDS. Both resistant and moderately resistant varieties are available. In an informal survey of seed companies showed that about 57% of cultivars are labeled as at least moderately resistant. Individual company lines had a range of 40%-60% of their cultivars labeled as at least moderately resistant. Not all seed companies give information regarding the impacts that SDS has on their soybean varieties. It is also recommended to plant a variety that is also resistant to SCN, as the presence of this pathogen can impact the response that a plant has to F. vurguliforme. Because of the symbiotic relationship between these two pathogens, it is important to collect information regarding both when selecting a soybean variety. Most seed companies will release information regarding SCN.

-Plant a week or two later: This is a practice that works well in theory but is hard to put into practice in the field. Due to tight schedules and unpredictable spring weather patterns in the Midwest and Great Plains, it can be hard to not plant soybeans as soon as possible. However, when possible, growers should consider waiting one or two weeks after typical early planting dates to allow soil to warm and dry, which will help protect the seedlings from being infected by F. virugliforme. The pathogen does not prefer to infect seedlings in warmer and drier soil. If planting later is not an option, an extra pass over the field with a soil finisher or other shallow tillage implement will also help to expose soil and dry it out.

-Take active measures to decrease Soybean Cyst Nematode populations: A good way to help prevent and at least slow the spread and onset of F. virugliforme and SDS is to limit the spread and population of SCN. SCN and F. virugliforme have a symbiotic relationship that helps both to spread throughout fields. Limiting the spread of SCN can be a tedious task, as this requires the prevention of soil transferring from field to field. This means washing equipment and tires between fields. While this can be unrealistic for large growers, a recommendation is a quick rinsing of tires and equipment when moving to different areas or farms. While this is still tedious, it is not as time consuming as doing it after every field, and may save growers some yield down the road.

-Limit compaction: While this will not prevent SDS and its spread entirely, limiting soil compaction can help to lessen the severity and yield impact of SDS. When soil becomes compacted, it has less porosity and holds more water. This is very favorable to SDS infection and makes it very hard to control and lessen its severity. Practices that can help to limit compaction include using GPS to run in the same tracks every time you run a pass across the field (tillage, planting, spraying, etc.), using tracks or LSW flotation tires on equipment whenever possible, avoiding driving loaded grain trucks on the field whenever possible, and limiting the travel of loaded grain carts across the field as much as possible.

-Keeping an ideal soil pH: SDS thrives in soils with pH exceeding 7.0. SCN also thrives in high pH and can be controlled by lowering soil pH. Lowering soil pH below 6.5 leaves soybeans more vulnerable to brown stem rot. Regular soil sampling and the application of gypsum, lime and sulfur are good practices to help control soil pH.

-Tillage: No-till systems are particularly vulnerable to SDS, as the soil remains cooler and wetter due to not being tilled. While there are benefits to no-till systems, it may be beneficial to consider light tillage prior to planting in cooler and wetter years to help open-up soil to the wind and sun. This will help to dry and warm the soil slightly. Generally, this will require some form of disc or soil finisher, as the coulters on a no-till grain drill generally do not provide enough disturbance to make a measurable difference on soil temperature and moisture by the time of seedling germination. Corn and soybean residue that is left on the field and not tilled under has also been found to maintain inoculum levels of the fungus, which could possibly cause an SDS infection in the next soybean crop. For this reason, a deep tillage that disrupts surface soil is recommended in fields that have been known to have SDS problems in the past. Chisel plows, moldboard plows, field cultivators with v-shoes, and rippers are all effective tillage tools for this type of situation.
