= Fusarium pallidoroseum =

Scientific classification
- Domain: Eukaryota
- Kingdom: Fungi
- Division: Ascomycota
- Class: Sordariomycetes
- Order: Hypocreales
- Family: Nectriaceae
- Genus: Fusarium
- Species: F. pallidoroseum

Binomial name
- Fusarium pallidoroseum (Cooke) Sacc. (1886)

Synonyms
- Fusisporium pallidoroseum Cooke [as 'pallido-roseum'], Grevillea 6(no. 40): 139 (1878); Fusarium semitectum var. majus Wollenw., Fusaria autographica delineata 3: no. 907 (1930); Fusarium pallidoroseum var. majus (Wollenw.) R.F. Castañeda, P. Oliva, Fresneda & N. Rodr., Revta Jardín bot. Nac., Univ. Habana 10(2): 115; (1989)

Species of fungus

Fusarium pallidoroseum is a fungal and plant pathogen infecting banana, maize and pigeonpea.
