= Fusarium crown rot of wheat =

Species of fungus

Crown rot of wheat
- Causal agents: Fusarium pseudograminearum
- Hosts: Wheat
- EPPO Code: GIBBCO

Fusarium crown rot of wheat

Scientific classification
- Domain: Eukaryota
- Kingdom: Fungi
- Division: Ascomycota
- Class: Sordariomycetes
- Order: Hypocreales
- Family: Nectriaceae
- Genus: Fusarium
- Species: F. pseudograminearum

Binomial name
- Fusarium pseudograminearum O'Donnell & T. Aoki

Crown rot of wheat is caused by the fungal pathogen Fusarium pseudograminearum. F. pseudograminearum is a member of the fungal phylum Ascomycota and is also known as Gibberella coronicola (teleomorph). It is a monoecious fungus, meaning it does not require another host other than wheat to complete its life cycle. Although F. pseudograminearum can produce both anamorphic and teleomorphic states, the teleomorph is usually not present for crown rot of wheat. This Fusarium species has, until recently, been considered to be the same as the species known as Fusarium graminearum (head blight of wheat) due to many similar characteristics. One of the only differences between the two species is that F. pseudograminearum lacks its sexual stage on the wheat host.

An important characteristic in terms of infection that also distinguishes F. pseudgraminearum from F. graminearum is that F. pseudograminearum rarely infects the head of the wheat plant, only the crown, whereas F. graminearum can infect the entire wheat host. Other than these differences, the signs and symptoms of both fungal pathogens are very similar, showing necrosis of the stem base and crown. F. pseudograminearum also produces mycotoxins once colonization of the wheat has been fully established, which are responsible for the majority of the symptoms produced. Crown Rot of Wheat is an important plant disease that needs to be well managed due to its detrimental effects that it can have on entire fields of wheat. The infection of F. pseudograminearum can develop during stressful water deficits in fields and can spread quickly to other wheat plants, whose symptoms will ultimately lead to plant death.

== Hosts and symptoms ==
Fusarium pseudograminearum has a limited host range, only infecting species of wheat and barley. F. pseudograminearum can infect seedlings, but can also infect the crowns of mature wheat hosts. Crown rot of wheat produces asexual structures called conidiospores, which are produced in sporodochium structures inside the stem of the infected host. As the conidiospores germinate and invade the xylem and pith of the stem, both the stem and crown develop a red-brown or white discoloration. The primary infection of the host’s xylem is thought to occur at the crown or lower sheath of the stem from stubble containing a spore and mycelial inoculum. The infection of the xylem leaves the tissue water-soaked and with a pink or salmon color. As the infection proliferates the crown then becomes punky and is ultimately dysfunctional.

Due to the vast infection throughout the host, the plant's growth is stunted and will show incomplete grain fill. As well as infecting the xylem and pith of the host, F. pseudograminearum produces mycotoxins once it has fully been established. Mycotoxins are toxins produced by fungi that are harmful to animals and human if consumed. F. pseudograminearum produces the trichothecene mycotoxin deoxynivalenol, or DON, which spreads throughout the plant stem and builds up in the tissue. The production of DON can produce the formation of whiteheads, which are heads of grain that died prematurely. It is known that F. pseudograminearum does not infect the heads of the wheat, but the formation of the "whiteheads" is a secondary symptom of the buildup of the mycotoxin DON. The transport dysfunction occurring in the xylem and the buildup of DON will ultimately lead to death of the infected wheat plants.

== Disease cycle ==
The disease cycle of F. pseudograminearum includes both sexual and asexual stages, however the sexual stage has been observed to not play an important role in the establishment of the disease. Overwintering on crop residue, seeds, or in the soil is easily accomplished for this Fusarium species due to the formation of survival structures called chlamydospores. As spring arrives the chlamydospores are signaled to germinate, producing asexual structures called conidia. As mentioned previously, the formation of sexual structures is rare in the field, but the pathogen's teleomorph would produce structures called perithecia. As the perithecia form they would produce asci that contain ascospores inside. The perithecia forcibly discharge the ascospores and then those airborne spores are disseminated either by wind, rain, or animal. These sexual spores then land on a mature wheat host and would start to colonize the stem and area around the crown as summer proliferates. However, the asexual stage of F. pseudograminearum is a much simpler cycle that produces the most damage to the wheat.

Conidia, produced from the chlamydospores in soil or spread by wind, can infect wheat through natural openings and colonize the xylem and pith of the host. Formation of asexual structures called sporodochia can produce even more conidia, which act as a repeating infection stage. Soon the wheat plant will have multiple infection sites, most of which are near the crown. As harvest season approaches at the end of the summer the dry warm environment has allowed F. pseudograminearum to colonize the plant and start producing harmful mycotoxins that produce secondary symptoms in the grains of the wheat. The mycotoxin DON is harmful to animal and humans that consume the wheat, which makes the crop inedible and is thus a costly problem (Miedaner et al. 2008).

== Environment ==
Crown rot of wheat caused by Fusarium is a widespread disease. It was previously believed that crown rot is restricted in its geographical distribution. In the United States, the disease is most prevalent in the driest and warmest regions of the Pacific Northwest. However, recent investigations have suggested that the disease is found in most cereal producing regions of the world.

Local environmental conditions play a large role in the prevalence of F. pseudograminearum. This is particularly evident during late season when the crops are maturing. While both rainfall and temperature are important, studies have shown that rainfall plays a much larger role in the prevalence and severity of crown rot, although a weak temperature-disease correlation does exist. In the field survey of wheat crops in Australia, the maximum summer temperature in areas where F. pseudograminearum was found to be as high as 31 °C. Under drought conditions, where warm and dry weather predominates, crown rot symptoms are intensified. This is largely due to the pathogen's ability to survive and thrive under these conditions. Laboratory studies suggest that F. pseudograminearum grows best under dry (<-1MPa) conditions. They further showed that while the pathogen grew fairly well in temperatures ranging from 5 °C to 30 °C, it does not grow well at 5 °C or 35 °C.

== Management ==
The most common management practice for controlling Fusarium crown rot of wheat is to use resistant varieties. While no fully resistant variety exists, resistance in the form of tolerance to the disease can be used. A few of the resistant wheat varieties include 2–49, Sunco, Kukri, Brundage, Gene, Weatherford, Madson, Temple, and Tubbs. Tolerance still allows the host to become infected by the pathogen, but it provides the host with the ability to withstand the infection and produce an acceptable yield.

Agronomic practices can be used to reduce the severity of Fusarium crown rot on wheat, but they cannot eliminate the disease. Practices which can help reduce the risk of disease are: not rotating wheat with oats, tilling fields after harvest to improve water infiltration, establishing a dust and stubble mulch in the spring, applying the correct amount of nitrogen to fields, and planting wheat at an intermediate planting date which balances the larger plants and greater stress of early planting with the lower yields of later planting. These practices work to reduce disease by creating an unfavorable environment for the pathogen or by making the host less susceptible. Since these practices do not necessarily line up with preferred agronomic and economic considerations, the use of resistant or tolerant varieties is becoming the accepted management practice.

== Importance ==
Fusarium crown rot is one of the most important ailments affecting wheat. Because of wheat’s central role in the global diet, crown rot represents a major economic concern. Not only is crown rot severe, it is also widespread. Across the United States, average losses in winter wheat resulting from crown rot have been estimated to be as high as 9.5% through large areas of the Pacific northwest. Similar losses are seen in other western states in the United States.

Beyond North America, crown rot is a particularly concerning disease in Australia. In the past three decades, crown rot has become the disease of greatest relative importance in the northern grain producing regions of Australia. Overall, it is only second to septoria blotch in terms of its economic impact to wheat. Experts believe that the recent surge in crown rot prevalence in Australia is most likely resulting from cereals being growing in closer rotations and stubble retention practices becoming more prevalent. Furthermore, in seasons where environmental conditions permit, crown rot can decrease wheat yield by up to 100% in Australia and up to 65% in North America.

Aside from the disease-induced crop loss, crown rot is also significant due to the toxicity of infected wheat. As noted above, DON is produced by F. pseudograminearum during disease development. DON has been shown to be toxic to both humans as well as animals after they inject the infected crop. In some European nations, the government has put out regulatory guidelines suggesting that DON's total daily intake should not exceed 1μg/kg. Therefore, the combination of yield loss and diseased crop toxicity makes crown rot an extremely important disease for global food supply.
