= Fusarium langsethiae =

Scientific classification
- Kingdom: Fungi
- Division: Ascomycota
- Class: Sordariomycetes
- Order: Hypocreales
- Family: Nectriaceae
- Genus: Fusarium
- Species: F. langsethiae

Binomial name
- Fusarium langsethiae Torp & Nirenberg (2004)

Species of fungus

Fusarium langsethiae is a species of fungus in the family Nectriaceae. It is a suspected plant pathogen. This species was isolated from oats, wheat and barley kernels in several European countries. It resembles Fusarium poae, from which it differs by slower growth, less aerial mycelium and absence of odour. Its turnip-shaped or spherical conidia are borne in the aerial mycelium, whereas those of F. poae are produced on straight monophialides mostly in the aerial mycelium. It does not produce sporodochial conidia.
