= Fusarium arthrosporioides =

Scientific classification
- Kingdom: Fungi
- Division: Ascomycota
- Class: Sordariomycetes
- Order: Hypocreales
- Family: Nectriaceae
- Genus: Fusarium
- Species: F. arthrosporioides

Binomial name
- Fusarium arthrosporioides Sherb., (1915)

Synonyms
- Fusarium roseum var. arthrosporioides (Sherb.) Messiaen & R. Cass., (1981); Fusarium roseum var. arthrosporioides (Sherb.) Messiaen & R. Cass., (1968)

Species of fungus

Fusarium arthrosporioides is a fungal plant pathogen. It is a part of the Fusarium tricinctum species complex (FTSC).

== See also ==
- List of chickpea diseases
