= Fusarium acaciae-mearnsii =

Scientific classification
- Domain: Eukaryota
- Kingdom: Fungi
- Division: Ascomycota
- Class: Sordariomycetes
- Order: Hypocreales
- Family: Nectriaceae
- Genus: Fusarium
- Species: F. acaciae-mearnsii

Binomial name
- Fusarium acaciae-mearnsii O'Donnell, T. Aoki, Kistler & Geiser 2004

Synonyms
- Fusarium acacia mearnsii

Species of fungus

Fusarium acaciae-mearnsii is a fungus species of the genus Fusarium which produces zearalenone and zearalenol.
