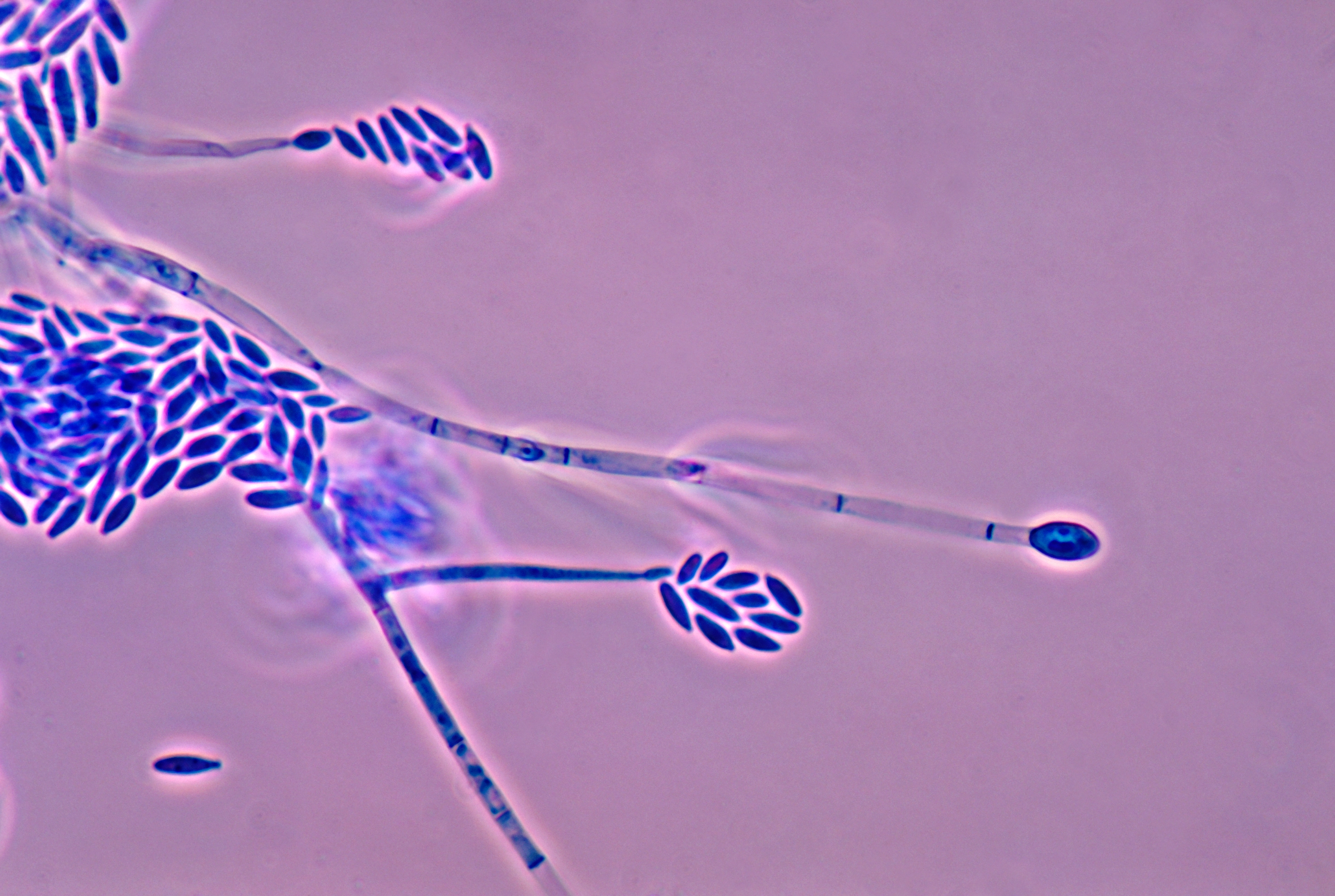
- Fusarium verticillioides

Scientific classification
- Kingdom: Fungi
- Division: Ascomycota
- Class: Sordariomycetes
- Order: Hypocreales
- Family: Nectriaceae
- Genus: Fusarium; Link (1809)

Species
- List of Fusarium species

Synonyms
- List: Bidenticula Deighton (1972); Cyanonectria Samuels & P.Chaverri (2009); Disco-fusarium Petch (1921); Fusidomus Grove (1929); Fusisporium Link (1809); Geejayessia Schroers, Gräfenhan & Seifert (2011); Gibberella Sacc. 1877); Gibberella subgen. Lisiella Cooke & Massee (1887); Haematonectria Samuels & Nirenberg (1999); Hyaloflorea Bat. & H.Maia (1955); Lachnidium Giard (1891); Lisea Sacc. (1877); Lisiella (Cooke & Massee) Sacc. (1891); Neocosmospora E.F.Sm. (1899); Nothofusarium Crous, Sand.-Den. & L.Lombard (2021); Pionnotes Fr. (1849); Pseudofusarium Matsush. (1971); Pycnofusarium Punith. (1973); Rachisia Lindner (1913); Selenosporium Corda (1837); Septorella Allesch. (1897); Sporotrichella P.Karst. (1887); Stagonostroma Died. (1914); Trichofusarium Bubák (1906); Ustilaginoidella Essed (1911)

= Fusarium =

Genus of fungi

Fusarium is a genus of fungi with a complex and disputed taxonomy. Phylogenetic studies have identified several major clades within the genus, and different taxonomic schemes have either retained agriculturally important Fusarium species in a single genus or divided them among several genera.

The genus includes economically important plant pathogens. Fusarium graminearum infects cereal crops, while forms of Fusarium oxysporum cause diseases including Panama disease of bananas. Some species also produce mycotoxins, including trichothecenes, zearalenone and fumonisins, which can contaminate food and animal feed. Some Fusarium species can cause opportunistic infections in humans, ranging from infections of the nails and cornea to disseminated infections in people with weakened immune systems. Infections have also been reported in several other animals.

== Taxonomy ==
The taxonomy of the genus is complex. Phylogenetic studies show seven major clades within the genus. Different taxnomic schemes have been used, and up to 1,000 species have been identified, with approaches varying between wide and narrow concepts of speciation (lumpers and splitters).

One proposal with wide specialist subscription maintains the genus as singular, including all agriculturally significant Fusaria species; a counterproposal—unrelated to Watanabe 2011—divides the one into seven entirely separate genera.

=== Subdivision ===
Various schemes have subdivided the genus into subgenera and sections. There is a poor correlation between sections and phylogenetic clades.

Sections previously described include:

- Arachnites
- Arthrosporiella
- Discolour
- Elegans
- Eupionnotes
- Gibbosum
- Lateritium
- Liseola
- Martiella
- Ventricosum
- Roseum
- Spicarioides
- Sporotrichiella

=== Species ===
Selected species include:

- Fusarium acaciae
- Fusarium fujikuroi
- Fusarium acaciae-mearnsii
- Fusarium acuminatum
- Fusarium acutatum
- Fusarium aderholdii
- Fusarium acremoniopsis
- Fusarium affine
- Fusarium arthrosporioides
- Fusarium avenaceum
- Fusarium bubigeum
- Fusarium circinatum
- Fusarium crookwellense
- Fusarium culmorum
- Fusarium graminearum
- Fusarium incarnatum
- Fusarium langsethiae
- Fusarium mangiferae
- Fusarium merismoides
- Fusarium oxysporum
- Fusarium pallidoroseum
- Fusarium poae
- Fusarium proliferatum
- Fusarium pseudograminearum
- Fusarium redolens
- Fusarium sacchari
- Fusarium solani
- Fusarium sporotrichioides
- Fusarium sterilihyphosum
- Fusarium subglutinans
- Fusarium sulphureum
- Fusarium tricinctum
- Fusarium udum
- Fusarium venenatum
- Fusarium verticillioides
- Fusarium virguliforme
- Fusarium xyrophilum

== Mycotoxins ==
Some Fusarium species produce mycotoxins that can contaminate food and animal feed. The major classes of Fusarium mycotoxins are trichothecenes, zearalenone and fumonisins, which can have toxic effects in humans and animals.

== Pathogen ==
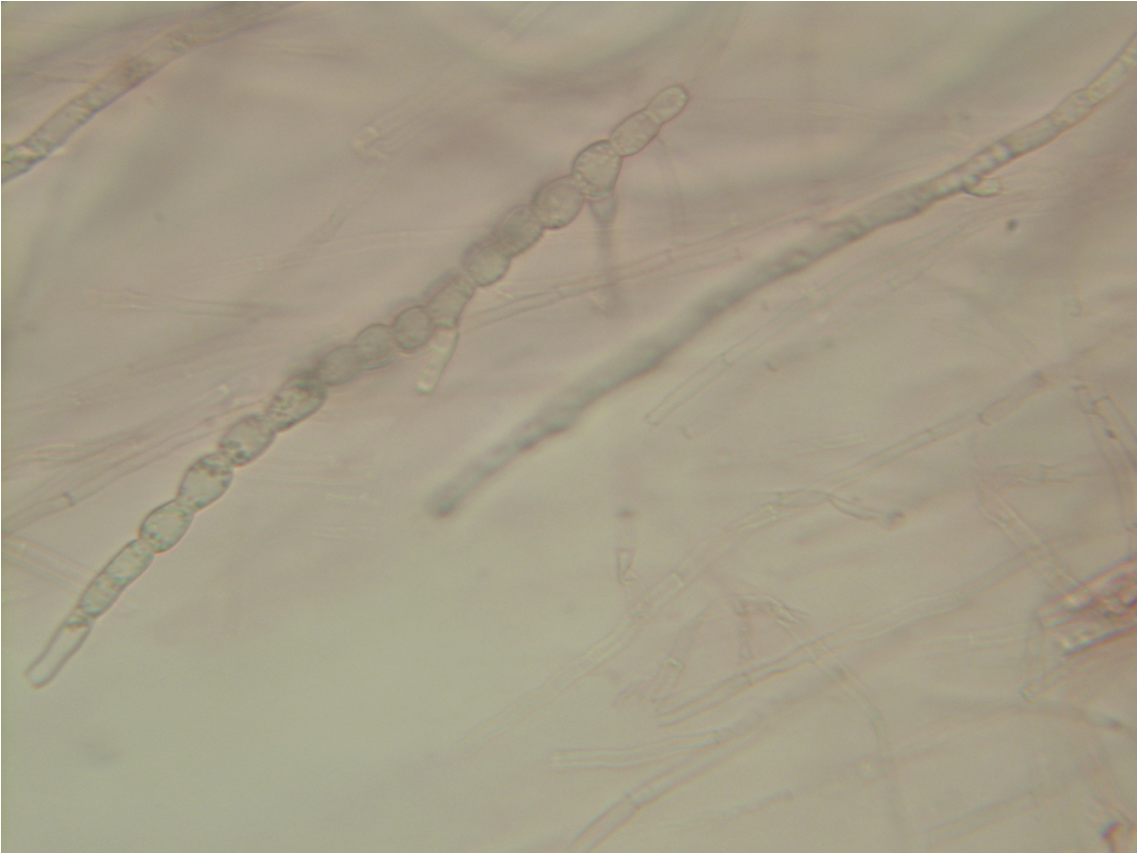
Fusarium chlamydospores

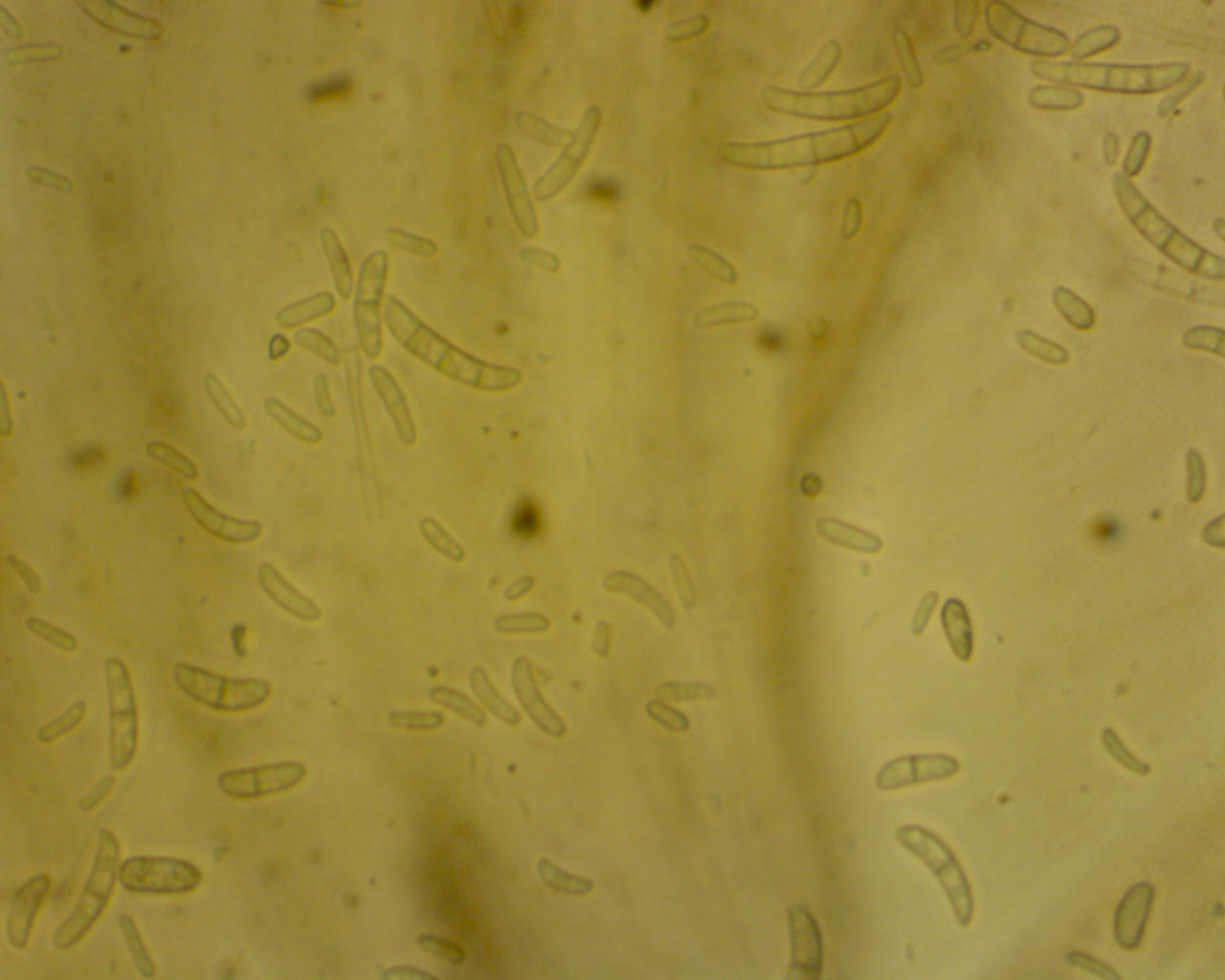
Micro and macro conidia under 45x magnification

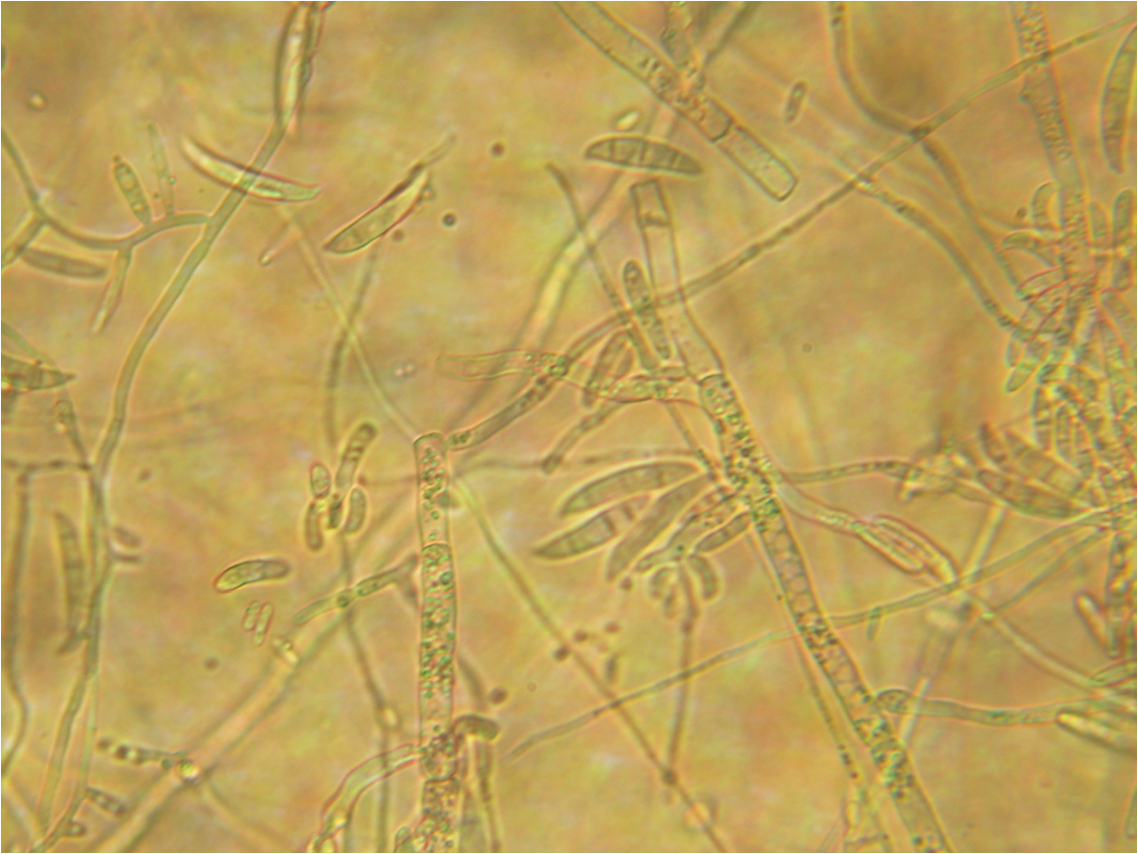
Macroconidia

The genus includes a number of economically important plant pathogenic species.

Fusarium graminearum commonly infects barley if there is rain late in the season. It is of economic impact to the malting and brewing industries, as well as feed barley. Fusarium contamination in barley can result in head blight, and in extreme contaminations, the barley can appear pink. The genome of this wheat and maize pathogen has been sequenced. F. graminearum can also cause root rot and seedling blight. The total losses in the US of barley and wheat crops between 1991 and 1996 have been estimated at $3 billion.

Fusarium oxysporum f.sp. cubense is a fungal plant pathogen that causes Panama disease of banana (Musa spp.), also known as fusarium wilt of banana. Panama disease affects a wide range of banana cultivars, which are propagated asexually from offshoots and therefore have very little genetic diversity. Panama disease is one of the most destructive plant diseases of modern times, and caused the commercial disappearance of the once dominant Gros Michel cultivar. A more recent strain also affects the Cavendish cultivars which commercially replaced Gros Michel. It is considered inevitable that this susceptibility will spread globally and commercially wipe out the Cavendish cultivar, for which there are currently no acceptable replacements. Fusarium oxysporum has also been known to infect a variety of other fruit, vegetable and field crops. The rate of infection of these crops has led to economic losses worldwide.

Fusarium oxysporum f. sp. narcissi causes rotting of the bulbs (basal rot) and yellowing of the leaves of daffodils (Narcissi).

Fusarium xyrophilum was able to hijack a South American species of yellow-eyed Xyris grass, creating "pseudoflowers", fooling bees and other pollinating insects into visiting them, taking fungal spores to other plants. (For this phenomenon, see also Puccinia monoica.)

=== In humans ===
Some species may cause a range of opportunistic infections in humans. In humans with normal immune systems, fusarial infections may occur in the nails (onychomycosis) and in the cornea (keratomycosis or mycotic keratitis). In humans whose immune systems are weakened in a particular way, (neutropenia, i.e., very low neutrophils count), aggressive fusarial infections penetrating the entire body and bloodstream (disseminated infections) may be caused by members of the Fusarium solani complex, Fusarium oxysporum, Fusarium verticillioides, Fusarium proliferatum and, rarely, other fusarial species. In order to properly treat these infections, it is important, but often difficult, to identify the specific species causing the infection. These species are resistant to most antifungal drugs.

=== In animals ===
In particular cases, there have been descriptions of Fusarium infections in seahorses, turtles, dolphins, dogs, and pigs, among others.

An infection in sea turtles that is called sea turtle egg fusariosis (STEF) has been identified in Colombia, Costa Rica, Spain, and elsewhere.

== Research ==
The isolation medium for Fusaria is usually peptone PCNB agar (peptone pentachloronitrobenzene agar, PPA). For F. oxysporum specifically, Komada's medium is most common. Differential identification is difficult in some strains. Vegetative compatibility group analysis is best for some, is one usable method for others, and requires such a large number of assays that it is too complicated for yet others.

== Use as human food ==
Fusarium venenatum is produced industrially for use as a human food by Marlow Foods, Ltd., and is marketed under the name Quorn in Europe and North America.

Fusarium strain flavolapis is also produced as a human food by Nature's Fynd under the name Fy in North America. It is used as a part of Le Bernardin menu in several dishes.

Some consumers of fusarium products have shown food allergies similar in nature to peanut and other food allergies. People with known sensitivities to molds should exercise caution when consuming such products.

== Biological warfare ==
Mass casualties occurred in the Soviet Union in the 1930s and 1940s when Fusarium-contaminated wheat flour was baked into bread, causing alimentary toxic aleukia with a 60% mortality rate. Symptoms began with abdominal pain, diarrhea, vomiting, and prostration, and within days, fever, chills, myalgias and bone marrow depression with granulocytopenia and secondary sepsis occurred. Further symptoms included pharyngeal or laryngeal ulceration and diffuse bleeding into the skin (petechiae and ecchymoses), melena, bloody diarrhea, hematuria, hematemesis, epistaxis, vaginal bleeding, pancytopenia and gastrointestinal ulceration. Fusarium sporotrichoides contamination was found in affected grain in 1932, spurring research for medical purposes and for use in biological warfare. The active ingredient was found to be trichothecene T-2 mycotoxin, and it was produced in quantity and weaponized prior to the passage of the Biological Weapons Convention in 1972. The Soviets were accused of using the agent, dubbed "yellow rain", to cause 6,300 deaths in Laos, Kampuchea, and Afghanistan between 1975 and 1981. The "biological warfare agent" was later purported to be merely bee feces, but the issue remains disputed.

== Pest ==
Fusarium has posed a threat to the ancient cave paintings in Lascaux since 1955, when the caves were first opened to visitors. The caves subsequently closed and the threat subsided, but the installation of an air conditioning system in 2000 caused another outbreak of the fungus which is yet to be resolved.

== Microbiota ==
Fusarium may be part of microbiota including digestive as well as oral/dental, there have been rare cases of Fusariosis presenting as a necrotic ulceration of the gingiva, extending to the alveolar bone has been reported in a granulocytopenic patient.

== Bibliography ==
- Nelson PE, Dignani MC, Anaissie EJ (October 1994). "Taxonomy, biology, and clinical aspects of Fusarium species". Clinical Microbiology Reviews. 7 (4): 479–504. doi:10.1128/cmr.7.4.479. PMC 358338. PMID 7834602.
- Moretti A (2009). "Taxonomy of Fusarium genus: A continuous fight between lumpers and splitters". Zbornik Matice Srpske Za Prirodne Nauke (117): 7–13. doi:10.2298/ZMSPN0917007M.
- Watanabe M, Yonezawa T, Lee K, Kumagai S, Sugita-Konishi Y, Goto K, Hara-Kudo Y (November 2011). "Molecular phylogeny of the higher and lower taxonomy of the Fusarium genus and differences in the evolutionary histories of multiple genes". BMC Evolutionary Biology. 11 (1): 322. Bibcode:2011BMCEE..11..322W. doi:10.1186/1471-2148-11-322. PMC 3270093. PMID 22047111.
- Summerell BA, Laurence MH, Liew EC, Leslie JF (September 14, 2010). "Biogeography and phylogeography of Fusarium: a review". Fungal Diversity. 44 (1): 3–13. doi:10.1007/s13225-010-0060-2. S2CID 37051295.
