= Fusarium proliferatum =

Scientific classification
- Kingdom: Fungi
- Division: Ascomycota
- Class: Sordariomycetes
- Order: Hypocreales
- Family: Nectriaceae
- Genus: Fusarium
- Species: F. proliferatum

Binomial name
- Fusarium proliferatum (Matsush.) Nirenberg ex Gerlach & Nirenberg (1982)

Synonyms
- Cephalosporium proliferatum Matsush. (1971), Microfungi of the Solomon Islands and Papua-New Guinea (Osaka): 11 (1971); Fusarium proliferatum (Matsush.) Nirenberg, Mitt. biol. BundAnst. Ld- u. Forstw. 169: 38 (1976); Fusarium proliferatum var. minus Nirenberg, Mitt. biol. BundAnst. Ld- u. Forstw. 169: 43 (1976)

Species of fungus

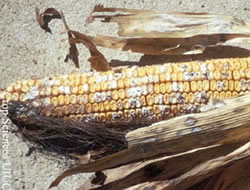
Fusarium ear rot of corn

Fusarium proliferatum is a fungal plant pathogen infecting crops and also can affect humans as well.

It has a worldwide distribution and has been associated with a variety of diseases in important economical crop plants, such as corn and bananas.

It can cause a disseminated infection in immunocompromised patients, The fungus can also cause an abscesses within the body where the trauma or damage is caused by a plant, such as Onychomycosis (nail infections). The fungus was discovered in 2003 as an agent that can cause Fusarium keratitis when found within a contact lens preservation solution.
