= Nandrolone phenylpropionate =

Anabolic steroid

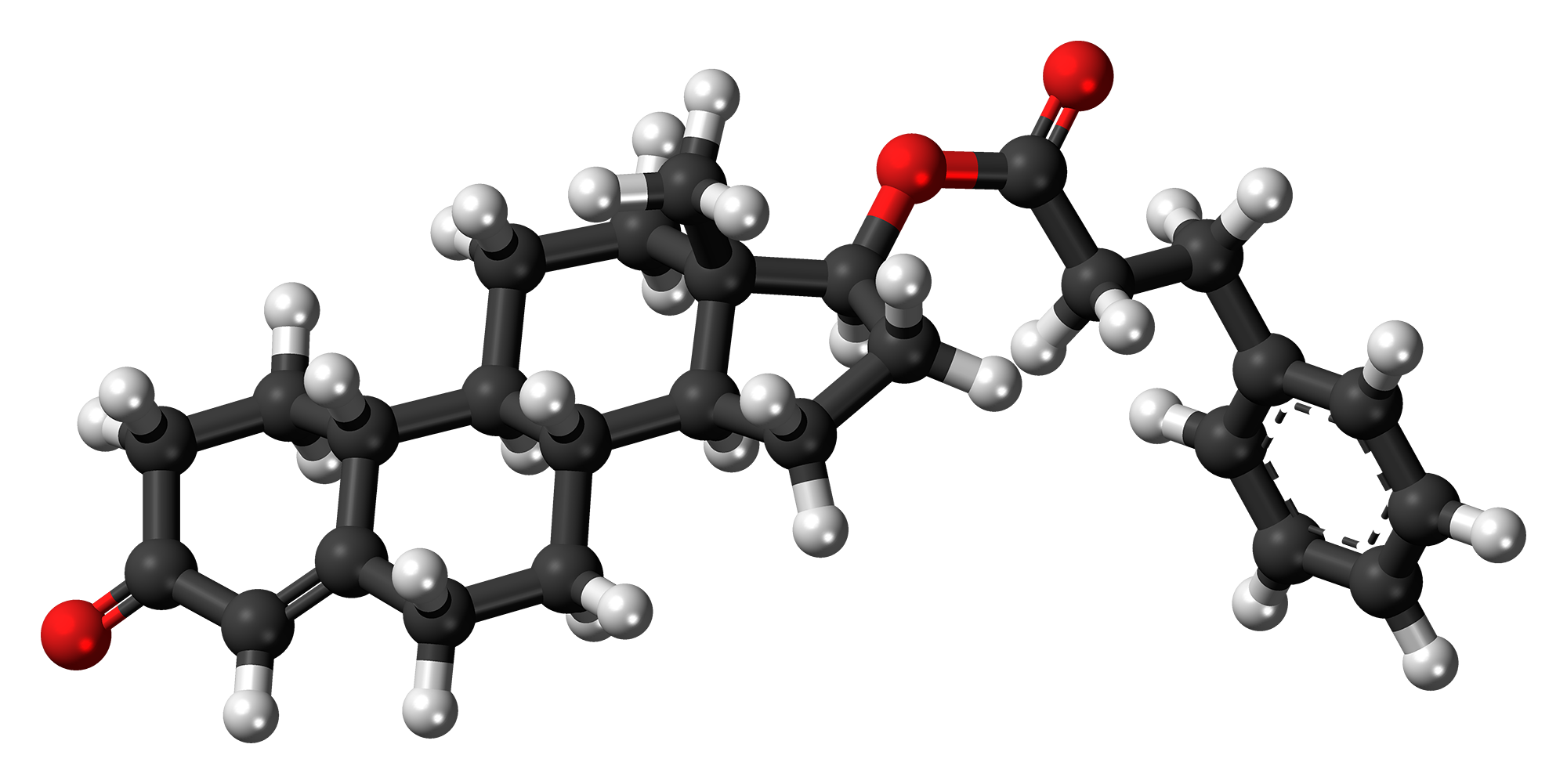

Clinical data
- Trade names: Durabolin, others
- Other names: • NPP • Nandrolone phenpropionate • 19-Nortestosterone phenylpropionate • Nandrolone hydrocinnamate • 19-Nortestosterone 17β-phenylpropionate • NSC-23162
- Pregnancy category: AU: D
- Routes of administration: Intramuscular injection
- Drug class: Androgen; Anabolic steroid; Androgen ester; Progestogen

Legal status
- Legal status: AU: S4 (Prescription only); CA: Schedule IV; UK: Class C; US: Schedule III

Pharmacokinetic data
- Bioavailability: • Oral: 0.3–2.9% (pigs) • Intramuscular: high
- Metabolism: Blood (hydrolysis), liver (reduction)
- Metabolites: • Nandrolone • 5α-Dihydronandrolone • 19-Norandrosterone • 19-Noretiocholanolone • Conjugates
- Elimination half-life: • Intramuscular: 2.7 days • Nandrolone: <4.3 hours
- Duration of action: • Intramuscular: 5–7 days
- Excretion: Urine

Identifiers
- IUPAC name: [(8R,9S,10R,13S,14S,17S)-13-methyl-3-oxo-2,6,7,8,9,10,11,12,14,15,16,17-dodecahydro-1H-cyclopenta[a]phenanthren-17-yl] 3-phenylpropanoate
- CAS Number: 62-90-8; nandrolone: 434-22-0
- PubChem CID: 229455
- DrugBank: DB00984
- ChemSpider: 199761
- UNII: KF7Z9K2T3W; nandrolone: 6PG9VR430D
- CompTox Dashboard (EPA): DTXSID2023353
- ECHA InfoCard: 100.000.502

Chemical and physical data
- Formula: C_{27}H_{34}O_{3}
- Molar mass: 406.566 g·mol^{−1}
- 3D model (JSmol): Interactive image
- SMILES: C[C@]12CC[C@H]3[C@H]([C@@H]1CC[C@@H]2OC(=O)CCC4=CC=CC=C4)CCC5=CC(=O)CC[C@H]35
- InChI: InChI=1S/C27H34O3/c1-27-16-15-22-21-11-9-20(28)17-19(21)8-10-23(22)24(27)12-13-25(27)30-26(29)14-7-18-5-3-2-4-6-18/h2-6,17,21-25H,7-16H2,1H3/t21-,22+,23+,24-,25-,27-/m0/s1; Key:UBWXUGDQUBIEIZ-QNTYDACNSA-N

Nandrolone phenylpropionate (NPP), or nandrolone phenpropionate, sold under the brand name Durabolin among others, is an androgen and anabolic steroid (AAS) medication which has been used primarily in the treatment of breast cancer and osteoporosis in women. It is given by injection into muscle once every week. Although it was widely used in the past, the drug has mostly been discontinued and hence is now mostly no longer available.

Side effects of NPP include symptoms of masculinization like acne, increased hair growth, voice changes, and increased sexual desire. The drug is a synthetic androgen and anabolic steroid and hence is an agonist of the androgen receptor (AR), the biological target of androgens like testosterone and dihydrotestosterone (DHT). It has strong anabolic effects and weak androgenic effects, which give it a mild side effect profile and make it especially suitable for use in women and children. NPP is a nandrolone ester and a long-lasting prodrug of nandrolone in the body.

NPP was first described in 1957 and was introduced for medical use in 1959. It was the first nandrolone ester to be introduced, followed by nandrolone decanoate in 1962, and has been one of the most widely used nandrolone esters. However, in more recent times, the drug has been largely superseded by nandrolone decanoate, which is longer-acting and more convenient to use. In addition to its medical use, NPP is used to improve physique and performance. The drug is a controlled substance in many countries and so non-medical use is generally illicit.

== Medical uses ==
NPP has been used mainly in the treatment of advanced breast cancer in women and as an adjunct therapy for the treatment of senile or postmenopausal osteoporosis in women. Historically, it has also had a variety of other uses. Because of its reduced androgenic effects, the drug has not generally been used in androgen replacement therapy for androgen deficiency in men and has instead been used for solely for anabolic indications. However, nandrolone esters have more recently been proposed for the treatment of androgen deficiency in men due to favorable properties including their high ratio of anabolic to androgenic effects and consequent much lower risk of prostate enlargement, prostate cancer, and scalp hair loss relative to testosterone.

Androgen/anabolic steroid dosages for breast cancer
Route	Medication	Form	Dosage
Oral	Methyltestosterone	Tablet	30–200 mg/day
Oral	Fluoxymesterone	Tablet	10–40 mg 3x/day
Oral	Calusterone	Tablet	40–80 mg 4x/day
Oral	Normethandrone	Tablet	40 mg/day
Buccal	Methyltestosterone	Tablet	25–100 mg/day
Injection (IM or SC)	Testosterone propionate	Oil solution	50–100 mg 3x/week
Injection (IM or SC)	Testosterone enanthate	Oil solution	200–400 mg 1x/2–4 weeks
Injection (IM or SC)	Testosterone cypionate	Oil solution	200–400 mg 1x/2–4 weeks
Injection (IM or SC)	Mixed testosterone esters	Oil solution	250 mg 1x/week
Injection (IM or SC)	Methandriol	Aqueous suspension	100 mg 3x/week
Injection (IM or SC)	Androstanolone (DHT)	Aqueous suspension	300 mg 3x/week
Injection (IM or SC)	Drostanolone propionate	Oil solution	100 mg 1–3x/week
Injection (IM or SC)	Metenolone enanthate	Oil solution	400 mg 3x/week
Injection (IM or SC)	Nandrolone decanoate	Oil solution	50–100 mg 1x/1–3 weeks
Injection (IM or SC)	Nandrolone phenylpropionate	Oil solution	50–100 mg/week
Note: Dosages are not necessarily equivalent. Sources: See template.

=== Available forms ===
NPP is or has been available 25 mg/mL and 50 mg/mL formulations in oil solution for intramuscular injection.

== Non-medical uses ==
NPP is used for physique- and performance-enhancing purposes by competitive athletes, bodybuilders, and powerlifters. Nandrolone esters have been said to be the most popular AAS used by bodybuilders and in sports. This is in part due to the high ratio of anabolic to androgenic effect of nandrolone and its weak propensity for androgenic and estrogenic side effects.

== Side effects ==
The most common side effects of NPP consist of virilization (masculinization) in women, including symptoms such as acne, hirsutism (increased body/facial hair growth), hoarseness of the voice, and voice deepening. However, relative to most other AAS, NPP has a greatly reduced propensity for virilization and such side effects are relatively uncommon at recommended dosages. At higher dosages and/or with long-term treatment they make increase in incidence and magnitude however. A variety of uncommon and rare side effects may also occur.

== Interactions ==
Antiestrogens like aromatase inhibitors (e.g., anastrozole) and selective estrogen receptor modulators (e.g., tamoxifen, raloxifene) can interfere with and prevent the estrogenic effects of NPP. 5α-Reductase inhibitors like finasteride and dutasteride can prevent the inactivation of nandrolone in so-called "androgenic" tissues like the skin, hair follicles, and prostate gland and may therefore considerably increase its androgenic side effects. This is opposite to the case of most other AAS, which are either potentiated by 5α-reductase in such tissues or are not metabolized by 5α-reductase. Antiandrogens like cyproterone acetate, spironolactone, and bicalutamide can block both the anabolic and androgenic effects of NPP.

== Pharmacology ==
=== Pharmacodynamics ===
Nandrolone, the active form of NPP.

Androgenic vs. anabolic activity ratio of androgens/anabolic steroids
Medication	Ratio^{a}
Testosterone	~1:1
Androstanolone (DHT)	~1:1
Methyltestosterone	~1:1
Methandriol	~1:1
Fluoxymesterone	1:1–1:15
Metandienone	1:1–1:8
Drostanolone	1:3–1:4
Metenolone	1:2–1:3
Oxymetholone	1:2–1:9
Oxandrolone	1:13–1:3
Stanozolol	1:1–1:3
Nandrolone	1:3–1:16
Ethylestrenol	1:2–1:19
Norethandrolone	1:1–1:2
Notes: In rodents. Footnotes: ^{a} = Ratio of androgenic to anabolic activity. Sources: See template.

NPP is a nandrolone ester, or a prodrug of nandrolone. As such, it is an androgen and anabolic steroid, or an agonist of the androgen receptor, the biological target of androgens like testosterone. Relative to testosterone, NPP has enhanced anabolic effects and reduced androgenic effects. In addition to its anabolic and androgenic activity, NPP has low estrogenic activity (via its metabolite estradiol) and moderate progestogenic activity. Like other AAS, NPP has antigonadotropic effects, which are due to both its androgenic and progestogenic activity.

Relative affinities (%) of nandrolone and related steroids
Compound	PR	AR	ER	GR	MR	SHBG	CBG
Nandrolone	20	154–155	<0.1	0.5	1.6	1–16	0.1
Testosterone	1.0–1.2	100	<0.1	0.17	0.9	19–82	3–8
Estradiol	2.6	7.9	100	0.6	0.13	8.7–12	<0.1
Notes: Values are percentages (%). Reference ligands (100%) were progesterone for the PR, testosterone for the AR, estradiol for the ER, dexamethasone for the GR, aldosterone for the MR, dihydrotestosterone for SHBG, and cortisol for CBG. Sources: See template.

Relative affinities of nandrolone and related steroids at the androgen receptor
Compound	rAR (%)	hAR (%)
Testosterone	38	38
5α-Dihydrotestosterone	77	100
Nandrolone	75	92
5α-Dihydronandrolone	35	50
Ethylestrenol	ND	2
Norethandrolone	ND	22
5α-Dihydronorethandrolone	ND	14
Metribolone	100	110
Sources: See template.

=== Pharmacokinetics ===
NPP is converted into nandrolone in the body, which is the active form of the drug. It has an extended elimination half-life in the body when administered via intramuscular injection. Its duration of action is approximately one week and it is administered once every few days to once per week. The elimination half-life and duration of action of NPP are much shorter than those of nandrolone decanoate.

Parenteral durations of androgens/anabolic steroids
Medication	Form	Major brand names	Duration
Testosterone	Aqueous suspension	Andronaq, Sterotate, Virosterone	2–3 days
Testosterone propionate	Oil solution	Androteston, Perandren, Testoviron	3–4 days
Testosterone phenylpropionate	Oil solution	Testolent	8 days
Testosterone isobutyrate	Aqueous suspension	Agovirin Depot, Perandren M	14 days
Mixed testosterone esters^{a}	Oil solution	Triolandren	10–20 days
Mixed testosterone esters^{b}	Oil solution	Testosid Depot	14–20 days
Testosterone enanthate	Oil solution	Delatestryl	14–28 days
Testosterone cypionate	Oil solution	Depovirin	14–28 days
Mixed testosterone esters^{c}	Oil solution	Sustanon 250	28 days
Testosterone undecanoate	Oil solution	Aveed, Nebido	100 days
Testosterone buciclate^{d}	Aqueous suspension	20 Aet-1, CDB-1781^{e}	90–120 days
Nandrolone phenylpropionate	Oil solution	Durabolin	10 days
Nandrolone decanoate	Oil solution	Deca Durabolin	21–28 days
Methandriol	Aqueous suspension	Notandron, Protandren	8 days
Methandriol bisenanthoyl acetate	Oil solution	Notandron Depot	16 days
Metenolone acetate	Oil solution	Primobolan	3 days
Metenolone enanthate	Oil solution	Primobolan Depot	14 days
Note: All are via i.m. injection. Footnotes: ^{a} = TP, TV, and TUe. ^{b} = TP and TKL. ^{c} = TP, TPP, TiCa, and TD. ^{d} = Studied but never marketed. ^{e} = Developmental code names. Sources: See template.

Hormone levels with nandrolone esters by intramuscular injection
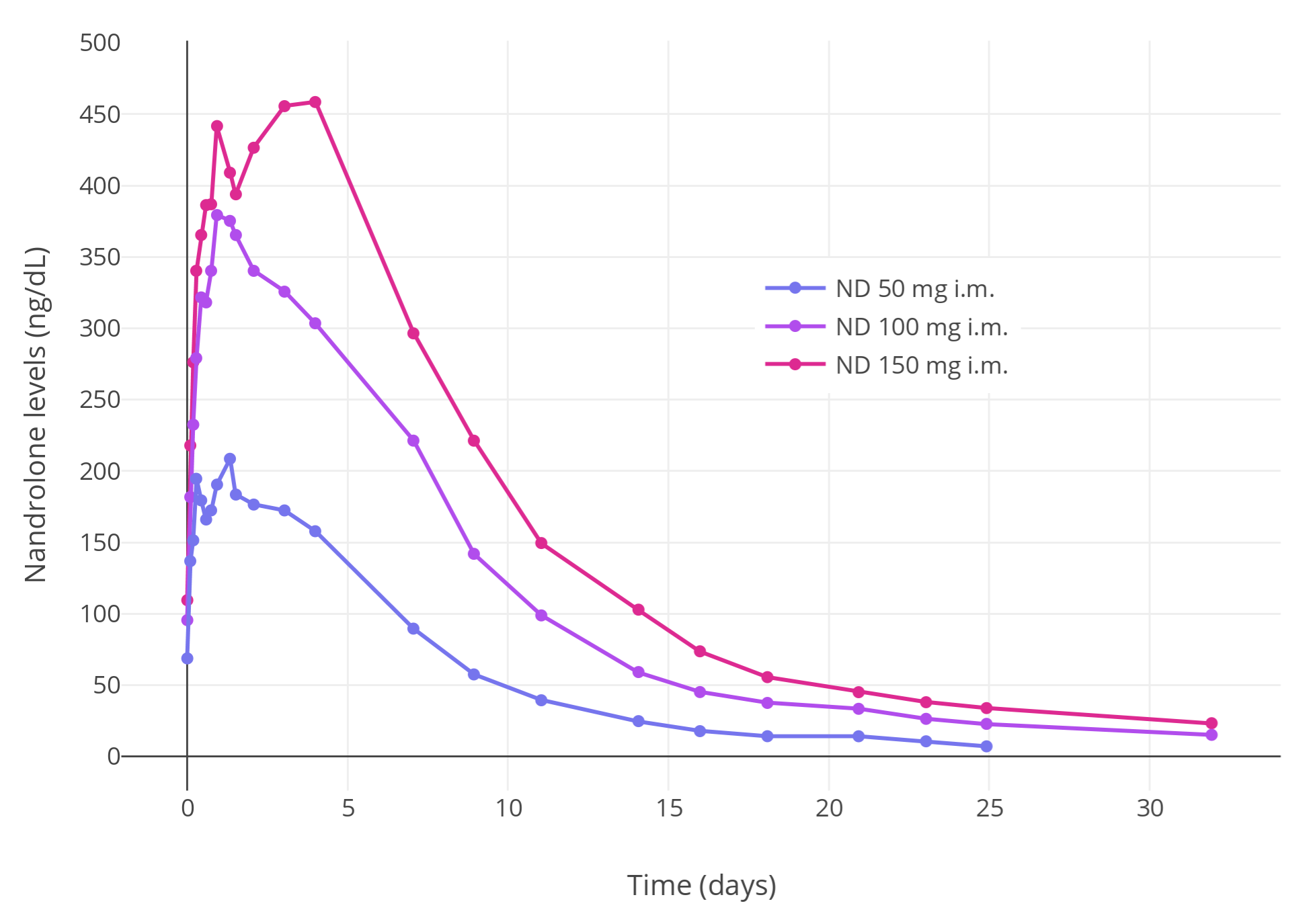
Nandrolone levels after a single 50, 100, or 150 mg intramuscular injection of nandrolone decanoate in oil solution in men.

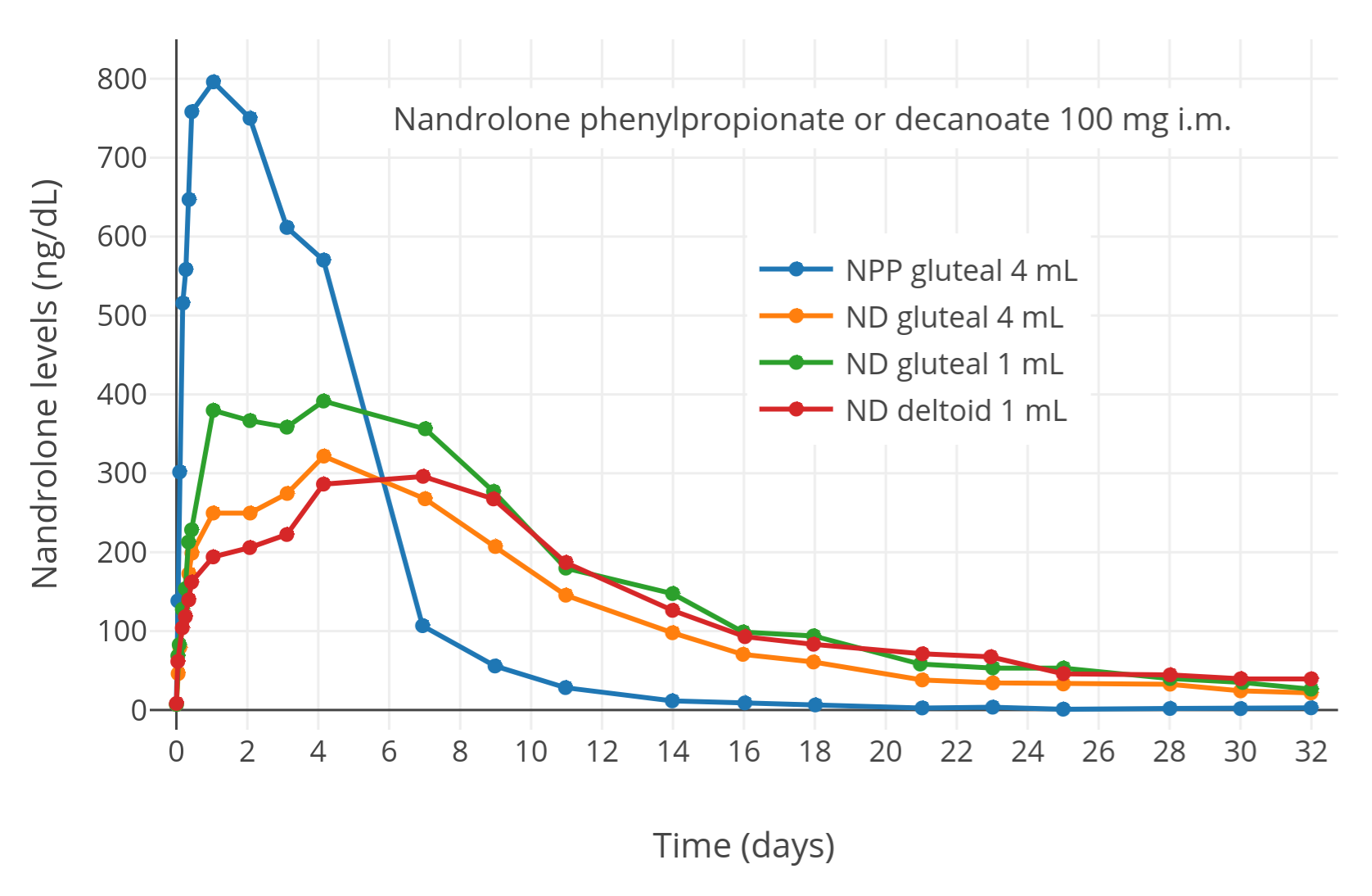
Nandrolone levels after a single 100 mg intramuscular injection of nandrolone decanoate or nandrolone phenylpropionate in 4 mL or 1 mL arachis oil solution into gluteal or deltoid muscle in men.

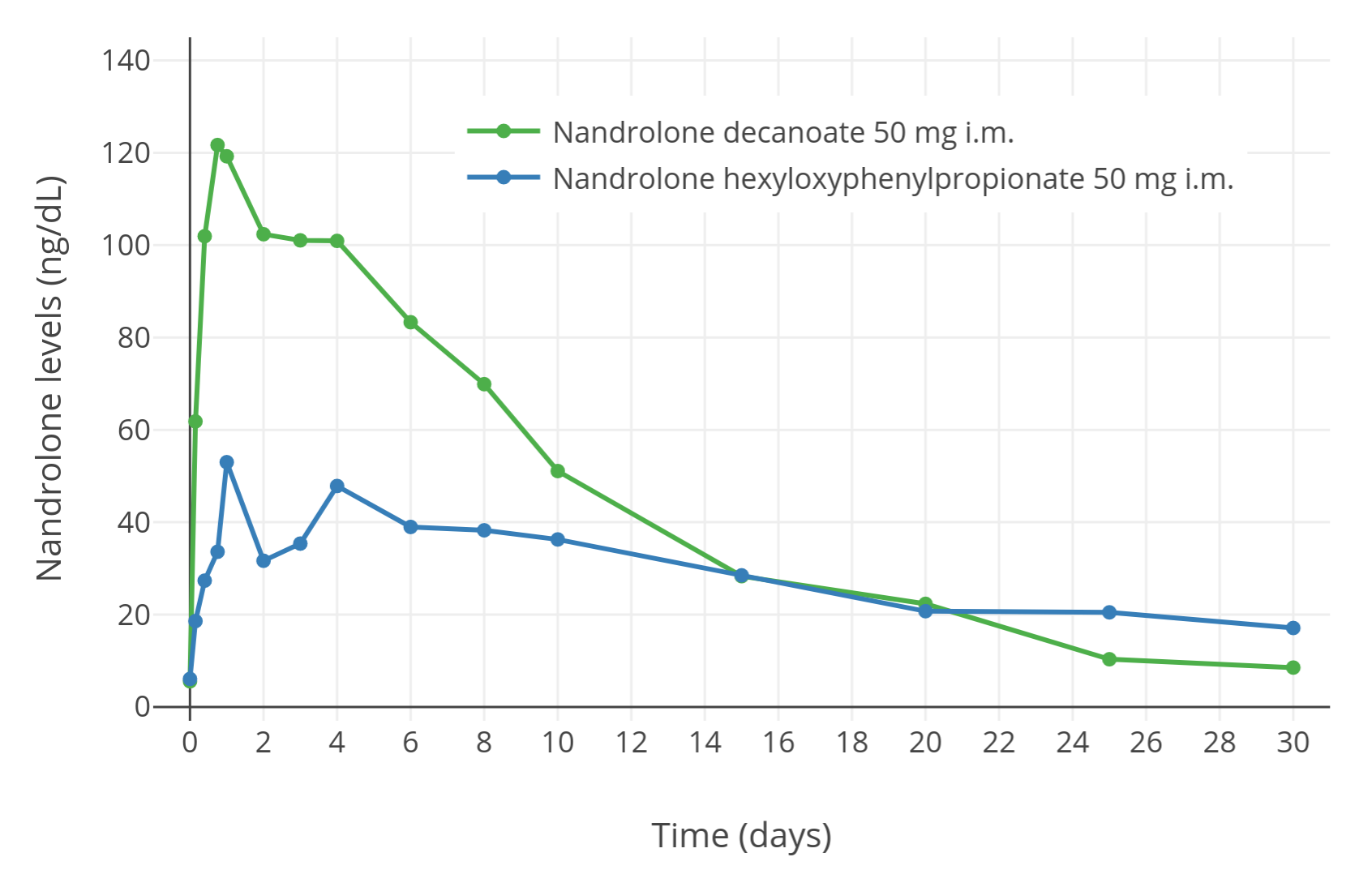
Nandrolone levels with a single 50 mg intramuscular injection of nandrolone decanoate or nandrolone hexyloxyphenylpropionate in oil solution in men.

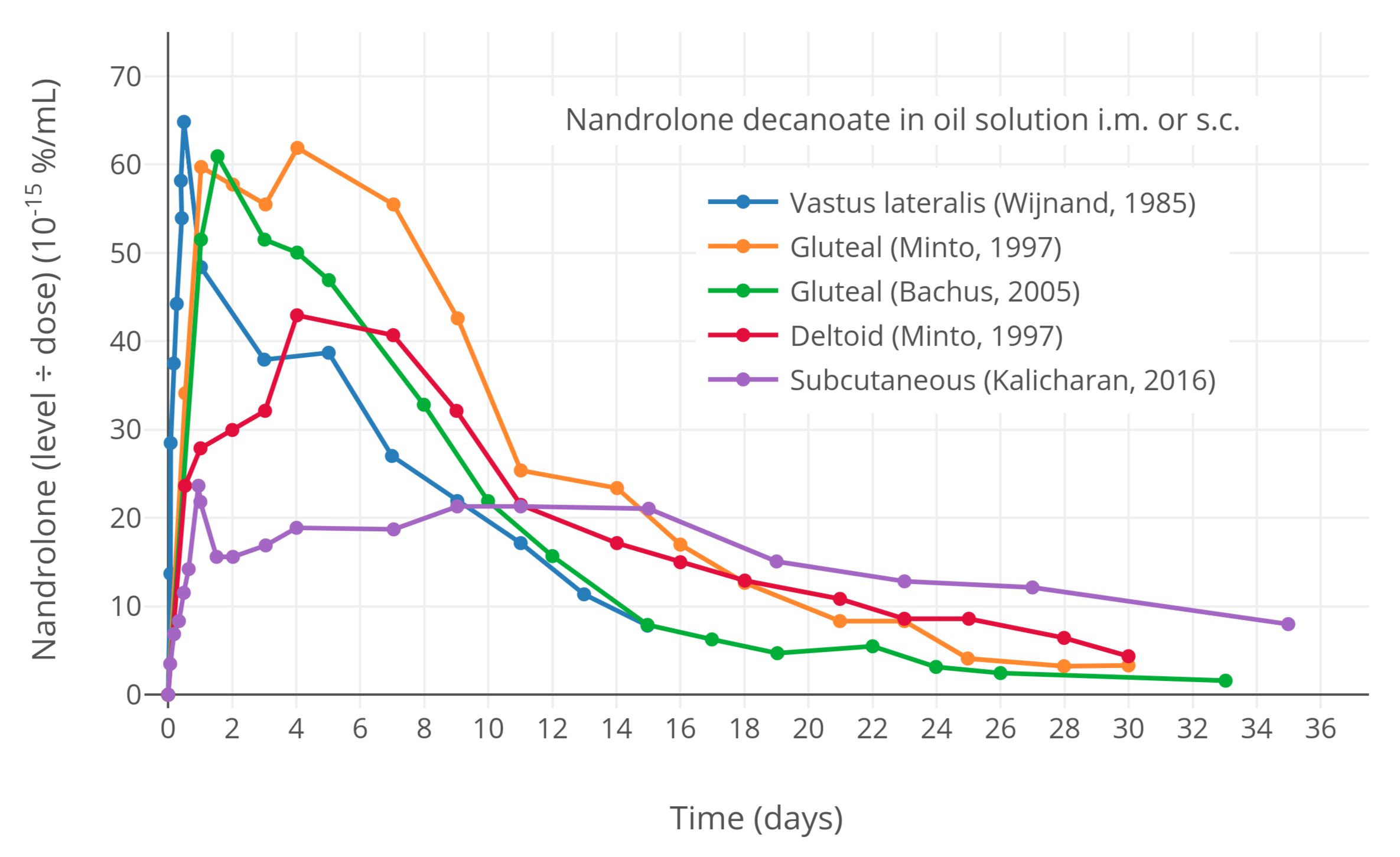
Dose-normalized nandrolone exposure (serum level divided by dose administered) with nandrolone decanoate in oil solution by intramuscular or subcutaneous injection in men.

== Chemistry ==
Nandrolone phenylpropionate, or nandrolone 17β-phenylpropionate, is a synthetic estrane steroid and a derivative of testosterone. It is an androgen ester; specifically, it is the C17β phenylpropionate ester of nandrolone (19-nortestosterone), which itself is the 19-demethylated analogue of testosterone.

Structural properties of major anabolic steroid esters
Anabolic steroid	Structure	Ester				Relative mol. weight	Relative AAS content^{b}	Duration^{c}
Anabolic steroid	Structure	Position	Moiety	Type	Length^{a}	Relative mol. weight	Relative AAS content^{b}	Duration^{c}
Boldenone undecylenate		C17β	Undecylenic acid	Straight-chain fatty acid	11	1.58	0.63	Long
Drostanolone propionate		C17β	Propanoic acid	Straight-chain fatty acid	3	1.18	0.84	Short
Metenolone acetate		C17β	Ethanoic acid	Straight-chain fatty acid	2	1.14	0.88	Short
Metenolone enanthate		C17β	Heptanoic acid	Straight-chain fatty acid	7	1.37	0.73	Long
Nandrolone decanoate		C17β	Decanoic acid	Straight-chain fatty acid	10	1.56	0.64	Long
Nandrolone phenylpropionate		C17β	Phenylpropanoic acid	Aromatic fatty acid	– (~6–7)	1.48	0.67	Long
Trenbolone acetate		C17β	Ethanoic acid	Straight-chain fatty acid	2	1.16	0.87	Short
Trenbolone enanthate^{d}		C17β	Heptanoic acid	Straight-chain fatty acid	7	1.41	0.71	Long
Footnotes: ^{a} = Length of ester in carbon atoms for straight-chain fatty acids or approximate length of ester in carbon atoms for aromatic fatty acids. ^{b} = Relative androgen/anabolic steroid content by weight (i.e., relative androgenic/anabolic potency). ^{c} = Duration by intramuscular or subcutaneous injection in oil solution. ^{d} = Never marketed. Sources: See individual articles.

== History ==
NPP was first described in 1957 and was introduced for medical use in 1959. It was initially used for a wide variety of indications, but starting in the 1970s its use became more restricted and its main uses became the treatment of breast cancer and osteoporosis in women. Today, NPP is scarcely available. The drug was the first form of nandrolone to be introduced, and was followed by nandrolone decanoate in 1962, which has been more widely used in comparison.

== Society and culture ==
=== Generic names ===
Nandrolone phenylpropionate is the generic name of the drug and its BAN while nandrolone phenpropionate is its USAN. It has also been referred to as nandrolone phenylpropanoate or as nandrolone hydrocinnamate.

=== Brand names ===
NPP is or has been marketed under a variety of brand names including Durabolin, Fenobolin, Activin, Evabolin, Grothic, Hybolin Improved, Metabol, Nerobolil, Neurabol, Norabol, Noralone, Sintabolin, Strabolene, and Superanabolon.

=== Availability ===
NPP is or has been marketed in many countries throughout the world, including in the United States, the United Kingdom, and Canada.

==== United States ====
NPP was marketed previously in the United States but is no longer available in this country. Nandrolone decanoate, conversely, is one of the few AAS that remains available for medical use in this country.

=== Legal status ===
NPP, along with other AAS, is a schedule III controlled substance in the United States under the Controlled Substances Act.
