= Testosterone enanthate =

Chemical compound

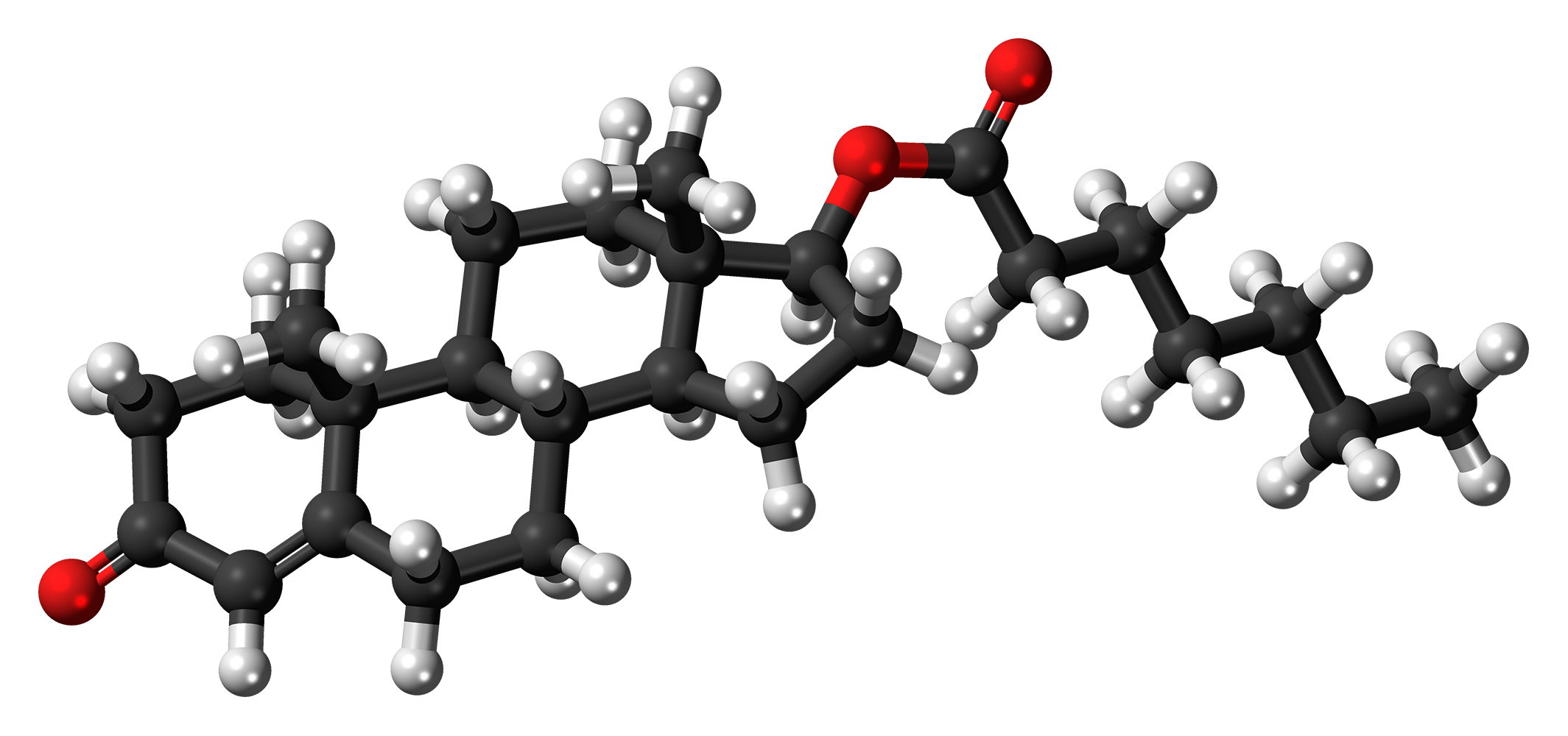

Clinical data
- Trade names: Delatestryl, Xyosted, others
- Other names: TE; Testosterone heptanoate; Testosterone 17β-heptanoate; NSC-17591
- Routes of administration: Intramuscular injection, subcutaneous injection
- Drug class: Androgen; Anabolic steroid; Androgen ester

Legal status
- Legal status: CA: Schedule IV; US: Schedule III

Pharmacokinetic data
- Bioavailability: Oral: very low Intramuscular: high
- Metabolism: Liver
- Elimination half-life: Intramuscular: 4–5 days
- Excretion: Urine

Identifiers
- IUPAC name: [(8R,9S,10R,13S,14S,17S)-10,13-dimethyl-3-oxo-1,2,6,7,8,9,11,12,14,15,16,17-dodecahydrocyclopenta[a]phenanthren-17-yl] heptanoate
- CAS Number: 315-37-7
- PubChem CID: 9416
- DrugBank: DB13944
- ChemSpider: 9045
- UNII: 7Z6522T8N9
- KEGG: D00958
- ChEBI: CHEBI:9464
- ChEMBL: ChEMBL1200335
- CompTox Dashboard (EPA): DTXSID701016540
- ECHA InfoCard: 100.005.686

Chemical and physical data
- Formula: C_{26}H_{40}O_{3}
- Molar mass: 400.603 g·mol^{−1}
- 3D model (JSmol): Interactive image
- SMILES: CCCCCCC(=O)O[C@H]1CC[C@@H]2[C@@]1(CC[C@H]3[C@H]2CCC4=CC(=O)CC[C@]34C)C
- InChI: InChI=1S/C26H40O3/c1-4-5-6-7-8-24(28)29-23-12-11-21-20-10-9-18-17-19(27)13-15-25(18,2)22(20)14-16-26(21,23)3/h17,20-23H,4-16H2,1-3H3/t20-,21-,22-,23-,25-,26-/m0/s1; Key:VOCBWIIFXDYGNZ-IXKNJLPQSA-N

Testosterone enanthate is used in the treatment of low testosterone levels in men, including hormone therapy for transgender men. It is given by injection into muscle or subcutaneously usually once every one to four weeks.

Side effects of testosterone enanthate include symptoms of masculinization like acne, increased hair growth, voice changes, and increased sexual desire. The drug is a synthetic androgen and anabolic steroid and hence is an agonist of the androgen receptor (AR), the biological target of androgens like testosterone and dihydrotestosterone (DHT). Testosterone enanthate is a testosterone ester and a long-lasting prodrug of testosterone in the body. Because it is a prodrug of testosterone, the testosterone it releases is bioidentical to the body's own hormone, which makes it useful for producing masculinization and suitable for androgen replacement therapy. Esterase enzymes break the ester bond in testosterone enanthate, releasing free testosterone and enanthic acid through hydrolysis. This process ensures a sustained release of testosterone in the body.

Testosterone enanthate was introduced for medical use in 1954. Along with testosterone cypionate, testosterone undecanoate, and testosterone propionate, it is one of the most widely used testosterone esters. In addition to its medical use, testosterone enanthate is used to improve physique and performance. The drug is a controlled substance in many countries and so non-medical use is generally illicit.

== Medical uses ==
Testosterone enanthate is used primarily in androgen replacement therapy. It is the most widely used form of testosterone in androgen replacement therapy. The medication is specifically approved, in the United States, for the treatment of hypogonadism in men, delayed puberty in boys, and breast cancer in women. It is also used in masculinizing hormone therapy for transgender men.

== Side effects ==
Side effects of testosterone enanthate include virilization among others. Approximately 10 percent of testosterone enanthate will be converted to 5α-dihydrotestosterone in men without endocrine disease or taking medication that disrupts this conversion, such as finasteride. 5α-Dihydrotestosterone (DHT) can promote masculine characteristics in both males and females. These masculine characteristics include: clitoral hypertrophy, androgenic alopecia, growth of body hair and deepening of the vocal cords. Dihydrotestosterone also plays an important role in male sexual function and may also be a contributing factor of ischemic priapism in males as shown in a study conducted on the use of finasteride to treat ischemic priapism in males. Testosterone enanthate can also lead to an increase in IGF-1 and IGFBP. Testosterone enanthate can also be converted to estradiol (E2) by the aromatase enzyme, which may lead to gynecomastia in males. Aromatase inhibitors, such as anastrozole, letrozole, exemestane, etc., can help to prevent the subsequent estrogenic activity of testosterone enanthate metabolites in the body.

== Pharmacology ==
=== Pharmacodynamics ===
Androgenic vs. anabolic activity ratio of androgens/anabolic steroids
Medication	Ratio^{a}
Testosterone	~1:1
Androstanolone (DHT)	~1:1
Methyltestosterone	~1:1
Methandriol	~1:1
Fluoxymesterone	1:1–1:15
Metandienone	1:1–1:8
Drostanolone	1:3–1:4
Metenolone	1:2–1:3
Oxymetholone	1:2–1:9
Oxandrolone	1:13–1:3
Stanozolol	1:1–1:3
Nandrolone	1:3–1:16
Ethylestrenol	1:2–1:19
Norethandrolone	1:1–1:2
Notes: In rodents. Footnotes: ^{a} = Ratio of androgenic to anabolic activity. Sources: See template.

Testosterone enanthate is a prodrug of testosterone and is an androgen and anabolic–androgenic steroid (AAS). That is, it is an agonist of the androgen receptor (AR).

Testosterone enanthate is converted by the body to testosterone that has both androgenic effects and anabolic effects; still, the relative potency of these effects can depend on various factors and is a topic of ongoing research. Esterase enzymes break the ester bond in testosterone enantate, releasing free testosterone and enanthic acid through hydrolysis. This process ensures a sustained release of free bioavailable and bioactive testosterone in the body. Testosterone can either directly exert effects on target tissues or be metabolized by the 5α-reductase enzymes into 5α-dihydrotestosterone (DHT) or aromatized to estradiol (E2). Aromatization in this context is the process where testosterone is converted to estradiol (E2) by the enzyme aromatase (CYP19A1 in humans). This conversion involves changing the structure of testosterone to include an aromatic ring A of a steroid nucleus, making it an estrogen, a so-called female hormone, which plays various roles in the body, such as regulating reproductive functions and bone density. If not aromatized (not converted into an estrogen), both testosterone and DHT are bioactive and bind to an androgen receptor; however, DHT has a stronger binding affinity than testosterone and may have more androgenic effect in certain tissues (such as prostate gland, skin and hair follicles) at lower levels.

=== Pharmacokinetics ===
Testosterone enanthate has an elimination half-life of 4.5 days and a mean residence time of 8.5 days when used as a depot intramuscular injection. It requires frequent administration of approximately once per week, and large fluctuations in testosterone levels result with it, with levels initially being elevated and supraphysiological. When testosterone enanthate is dissolved in an oil (such as castor oil), the oil acts as a depot, or reservoir, that slowly releases the drug into the bloodstream. This slow release is due to the oil's viscosity and the gradual breakdown of the ester bond by esterase enzymes. The oil creates a barrier that slows the diffusion of testosterone enanthate into the surrounding tissues, resulting in a more controlled and prolonged release compared to injecting pure testosterone enanthate. The rate at which testosterone enanthate is released from oils can vary based on the oil's viscosity and other properties such as drug solubility in the oil.

== Chemistry ==
Testosterone enanthate, or testosterone 17β-heptanoate, is a synthetic androstane steroid and a derivative of testosterone. It is an androgen ester; specifically, it is the C17β enanthate (heptanoate) ester of testosterone.

== History ==
Testosterone enanthate was described as early as 1952 and was first introduced for medical use in the United States in 1954 under the brand name Delatestryl.

== Society and culture ==
=== Generic names ===
Testosterone enanthate is the generic name of the drug and its USAN and BAN. It has also referred to as testosterone heptanoate.

=== Brand names ===
Testosterone enanthate is marketed primarily under the brand name Delatestryl.

It is or has been marketed under a variety of other brand names as well, including, among others:

- Andro LA
- Andropository
- Depandro
- Durathate
- Everone
- Testostroval
- Testrin
- Testro LA
- Xyosted
- pharmaqo labs

=== Availability ===
Testosterone enanthate is available in the United States and widely elsewhere throughout the world. Testosterone enanthate (testosterone heptanoate) is often available in concentrations of 200 mg per milliliter of fluid.

=== Legal status ===
Testosterone enanthate, along with other AAS, is a schedule III controlled substance in the United States under the Controlled Substances Act and a schedule IV controlled substance in Canada under the Controlled Drugs and Substances Act. Testosterone enantate is a prescription-only medicine (POM) in the United Kingdom, as well as a Class C controlled substance under Schedule 4 (Part II) of the Misuse of Drugs Act 1971.

== Research ==
As of October 2017, an auto-injection formulation of testosterone enanthate was in preregistration for the treatment of hypogonadism in the United States.

=== Xyosted ===
On October 1, 2018, the U.S. Food and Drug Administration (FDA) announced the approval of Xyosted. Xyosted, a product of Antares Pharma, Inc., is a single-use disposable auto-injector that dispenses testosterone enanthate. Xyosted is the first FDA-approved subcutaneous testosterone enanthate product for testosterone replacement therapy in adult males.
