= Norethandrolone =

Chemical compound

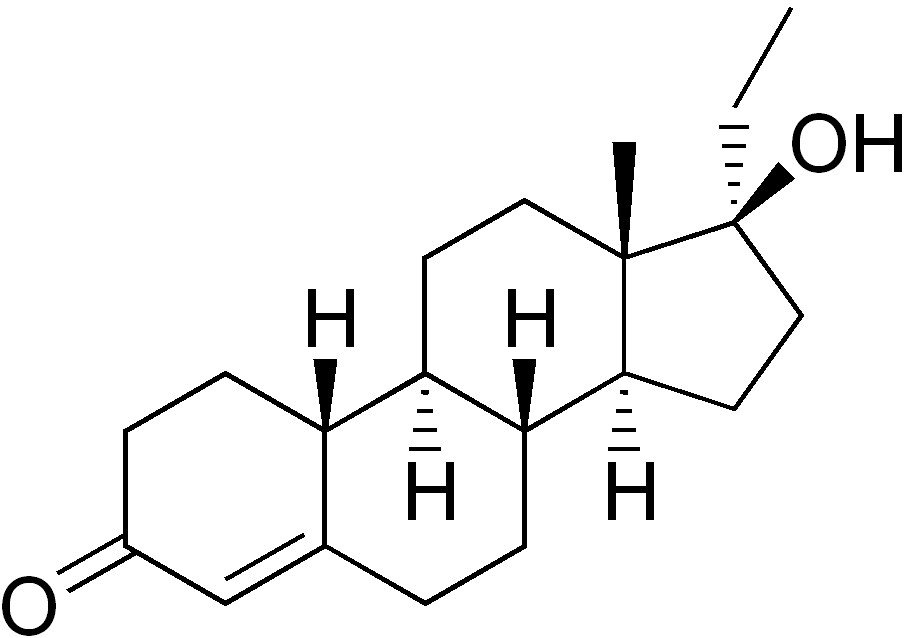

Clinical data
- Trade names: Nilevar, Pronabol
- Other names: Noretandrolone; CB-8022; 3-Ketoethylestrenol; Ethylestrenolone; 17α-Ethyl-19-nortestosterone; 17α-Ethylestr-4-en-17β-ol-3-one; 17α-Ethyl-19-norandrost-4-en-17β-ol-3-one; Ethylnandrolone; Ethylnortestosterone
- AHFS/Drugs.com: International Drug Names
- Routes of administration: By mouth
- Drug class: Androgen; Anabolic steroid; Progestin; Progestogen
- ATC code: A14AA09 (WHO)

Legal status
- Legal status: BR: Class C5 (Anabolic steroids); CA: Schedule IV; US: Schedule III

Identifiers
- IUPAC name: (8R,9S,10R,13S,14S,17S)-17-ethyl-17-hydroxy-13-methyl-1,2,6,7,8,9,10,11,12,14,15,16-dodecahydrocyclopenta[a]phenanthren-3-one
- CAS Number: 52-78-8
- PubChem CID: 5858
- ChemSpider: 5649
- UNII: P7W01638W6
- KEGG: D07127
- CompTox Dashboard (EPA): DTXSID0023379
- ECHA InfoCard: 100.000.140

Chemical and physical data
- Formula: C_{20}H_{30}O_{2}
- Molar mass: 302.458 g·mol^{−1}
- 3D model (JSmol): Interactive image
- SMILES: O=C4\C=C3/[C@@H]([C@H]2CC[C@]1([C@@H](CC[C@@]1(O)CC)[C@@H]2CC3)C)CC4
- InChI: InChI=1S/C20H30O2/c1-3-20(22)11-9-18-17-6-4-13-12-14(21)5-7-15(13)16(17)8-10-19(18,20)2/h12,15-18,22H,3-11H2,1-2H3/t15-,16+,17+,18-,19-,20-/m0/s1; Key:ZDHCJEIGTNNEMY-XGXHKTLJSA-N

Norethandrolone, sold under the brand names Nilevar and Pronabol among others, is an androgen and anabolic steroid (AAS) medication which has been used to promote muscle growth and to treat severe burns, physical trauma, and aplastic anemia but has mostly been discontinued. It is still available for use in France however. It is taken by mouth.

Side effects of norethandrolone include symptoms of masculinization like acne, increased hair growth, voice changes, and increased sexual desire. It can also cause estrogenic effects like fluid retention, breast tenderness, and breast enlargement in men and liver damage. The drug is a synthetic androgen and anabolic steroid and hence is an agonist of the androgen receptor (AR), the biological target of androgens like testosterone and dihydrotestosterone (DHT). It has strong anabolic effects relative to its androgenic effects. The drug also has strong progestogenic effects.

Norethandrolone was discovered in 1953 and was introduced for medical use in 1956. It was the first AAS with a favorable separation of anabolic and androgenic effect to be marketed. The drug was mostly withdrawn in the 1980s due to concerns of liver damage. In addition to its medical use, norethandrolone has been used to improve physique and performance. The drug is a controlled substance in many countries and so non-medical use is generally illicit.

== Medical uses ==
Norethandrolone has been used in the treatment of muscle wasting, patients with severe burns, after severe trauma, and for certain forms of aplastic anemia among other indications.

== Side effects ==
Side effects of norethandrolone include virilization among others. It has estrogenic effects and can cause gynecomastia and fluid retention. As with all 17α-alkylated AAS, long-term use of norethandrolone in high doses may result in hepatotoxicity including elevated liver enzymes and cirrhosis.

== Pharmacology ==
=== Pharmacodynamics ===
Androgenic vs. anabolic activity ratio of androgens/anabolic steroids
| Medication | Ratio^{a} |
|---|---|
| Testosterone | ~1:1 |
| Androstanolone (DHT) | ~1:1 |
| Methyltestosterone | ~1:1 |
| Methandriol | ~1:1 |
| Fluoxymesterone | 1:1–1:15 |
| Metandienone | 1:1–1:8 |
| Drostanolone | 1:3–1:4 |
| Metenolone | 1:2–1:3 |
| Oxymetholone | 1:2–1:9 |
| Oxandrolone | 1:13–1:3 |
| Stanozolol | 1:1–1:3 |
| Nandrolone | 1:3–1:16 |
| Ethylestrenol | 1:2–1:19 |
| Norethandrolone | 1:1–1:2 |
Notes: In rodents. Footnotes: ^{a} = Ratio of androgenic to anabolic activity. Sources: See template.

Norethandrolone is an androgen and anabolic steroid and hence is an agonist of the androgen receptor, the biological target of androgens like testosterone and dihydrotestosterone. It has a high ratio of anabolic to androgenic activity. Analogously to the case of nandrolone and 5α-dihydronandrolone, 5α-dihydronorethandrolone, the 5α-reduced metabolite of norethandrolone, shows diminished affinity for the androgen receptor relative to norethandrolone. This is likely related to the high ratio of anabolic to androgenic activity observed with norethandrolone. Norethandrolone has relatively high estrogenic activity via transformation by aromatase into the potent estrogen ethylestradiol. It also has strong progestogenic activity. The progestogenic potency of norethandrolone is similar to that of norethisterone in terms of endometrial changes in women. In addition, norethandrolone is hepatotoxic.

Relative affinities of nandrolone and related steroids at the androgen receptor
| Compound | rAR (%) | hAR (%) |
|---|---|---|
| Testosterone | 38 | 38 |
| 5α-Dihydrotestosterone | 77 | 100 |
| Nandrolone | 75 | 92 |
| 5α-Dihydronandrolone | 35 | 50 |
| Ethylestrenol | ND | 2 |
| Norethandrolone | ND | 22 |
| 5α-Dihydronorethandrolone | ND | 14 |
| Metribolone | 100 | 110 |
Sources: See template.

=== Pharmacokinetics ===
The pharmacokinetics of norethandrolone have been reviewed.

== Chemistry ==
Norethandrolone, also known as 17α-ethyl-19-nortestosterone or as 17α-ethylestr-4-en-17β-ol-3-one, is a synthetic estrane steroid and a 17α-alkylated derivative of testosterone and 19-nortestosterone (nandrolone). It is closely related to normethandrone (17α-methyl-19-nortestosterone) and to ethylestrenol (3-deketo-17α-ethyl-19-nortestosterone).

=== Synthesis ===
Chemical syntheses of norethandrolone have been published.

== History ==
Norethandrolone was synthesized at G. D. Searle & Company in 1953 and was originally studied as a progestin, along with norethisterone and noretynodrel, but ultimately was not marketed as such. In 1955, it was re-examined for testosterone-like activity and was found to have similar anabolic activity to testosterone but only one-sixteenth the androgenic potency. Norethandrolone was introduced for medical use as an AAS in 1956 and was the first so-called "anabolic steroid", or AAS with a favorable separation of anabolic and androgenic effect, to be marketed. It was followed by normethandrone as a progestin in 1957 and by the more well-known AAS nandrolone phenylpropionate in 1959. Norethandrolone was introduced in the United States in the late 1950s under the brand name Nilevar but was discontinued in this country in the 1960s due to limited sales. Although it was also introduced into Europe and certain other markets, it was withdrawn in many countries in the 1980s due to concerns of cholestatic jaundice. Today, the drug remains available only in France.

== Society and culture ==
=== Generic names ===
Norethandrolone is the generic name of the drug and its INN and BAN. It has also been referred to as noretandrolone, ethylnandrolone, and ethylnortestosterone, as well as by its developmental code name CB-8022.

=== Brand names ===
Norethandrolone is marketed under the brand names Nilevar and Pronabol.

=== Availability ===
Norethandrolone is available today only in France.

== Research ==
Norethandrolone has been studied for use in male hormonal contraception.
