= Ethylestrenol =

Chemical compound

Clinical data
- Trade names: Maxibolin, Orabolin, others
- Other names: Ethyloestrenol; Ethylnandrol; ORG-483; 3-Deketo-17α-ethyl-19-nortestosterone; 17α-Ethylestr-4-en-17β-ol; 19-Nor-17α-pregn-4-en-17β-ol
- AHFS/Drugs.com: International Drug Names
- Routes of administration: By mouth
- Drug class: Androgen; Anabolic steroid; Progestogen
- ATC code: A14AB02 (WHO)

Legal status
- Legal status: BR: Class C5 (Anabolic steroids); CA: Schedule IV; US: Schedule III

Identifiers
- IUPAC name: (8R,9S,10R,13S,14S,17S)-17-ethyl-13-methyl-2,3,6,7,8,9,10,11,12,14,15,16-dodecahydro-1H-cyclopenta[a]phenanthren-17-ol
- CAS Number: 965-90-2
- PubChem CID: 13765
- IUPHAR/BPS: 6948
- DrugBank: DB01493
- ChemSpider: 13168
- UNII: ADC79EK5Q8
- KEGG: D01414
- ChEBI: CHEBI:31578
- ChEMBL: ChEMBL1200623
- CompTox Dashboard (EPA): DTXSID6023024
- ECHA InfoCard: 100.012.294

Chemical and physical data
- Formula: C_{20}H_{32}O
- Molar mass: 288.475 g·mol^{−1}
- 3D model (JSmol): Interactive image
- SMILES: O[C@]2(CC[C@H]1[C@H]4[C@H](CC[C@@]12C)[C@@H]3\C(=C/CCC3)CC4)CC
- InChI: InChI=1S/C20H32O/c1-3-20(21)13-11-18-17-9-8-14-6-4-5-7-15(14)16(17)10-12-19(18,20)2/h6,15-18,21H,3-5,7-13H2,1-2H3/t15-,16+,17+,18-,19-,20-/m0/s1; Key:AOXRBFRFYPMWLR-XGXHKTLJSA-N

Ethylestrenol, also known as ethyloestrenol or ethylnandrol and sold under the brand names Maxibolin and Orabolin among others, is an androgen and anabolic steroid (AAS) medication which has been used in the past for a variety of indications such as to promote weight gain and to treat anemia and osteoporosis but has been discontinued for use in humans. It is still available for veterinary use in Australia and New Zealand however. It is taken by mouth.

Side effects of ethylestrenol include symptoms of masculinization like acne, increased hair growth, voice changes, and increased sexual desire. It can also cause liver damage. The drug is a synthetic androgen and anabolic steroid and hence is an agonist of the androgen receptor (AR), the biological target of androgens like testosterone and dihydrotestosterone (DHT). It has strong anabolic effects relative to its androgenic effects. The drug also has strong progestogenic effects. Ethylestrenol is a prodrug of norethandrolone.

Ethylestrenol was first described in 1959 and was introduced for medical use in 1961. In addition to its medical use, ethylestrenol has been used to improve physique and performance. However, it is described as a very weak muscle-builder compared to other AAS and in relation to this has not been commonly used for such purposes. The drug is a controlled substance in many countries and so non-medical use is generally illicit.

== Medical uses ==
Ethylestrenol has been used for a variety of indications including:

- To promote weight gain and muscle growth
- As an adjunct in the treatment of bone pain and decreased bone strength associated with osteoporosis
- As an adjunct for catabolic states such as corticosteroid therapy and convalescence as in chronic infections, extensive surgery, and severe trauma
- To treat treatment-refractory anemias (via stimulation of erythropoiesis) such as acquired and congenital aplastic anemia and anemia of chronic kidney disease
- As an adjunct to improve strength and well-being in arthritis
- To treat short stature in youth

== Contraindications ==
Ethylestrenol should not be taken by pregnant women as it can masculinize female fetuses. It is contraindicated in men with prostate cancer as it may accelerate the progression of the disease.

== Side effects ==
Side effects of ethylestrenol include virilization among others.

== Pharmacology ==
=== Pharmacodynamics ===
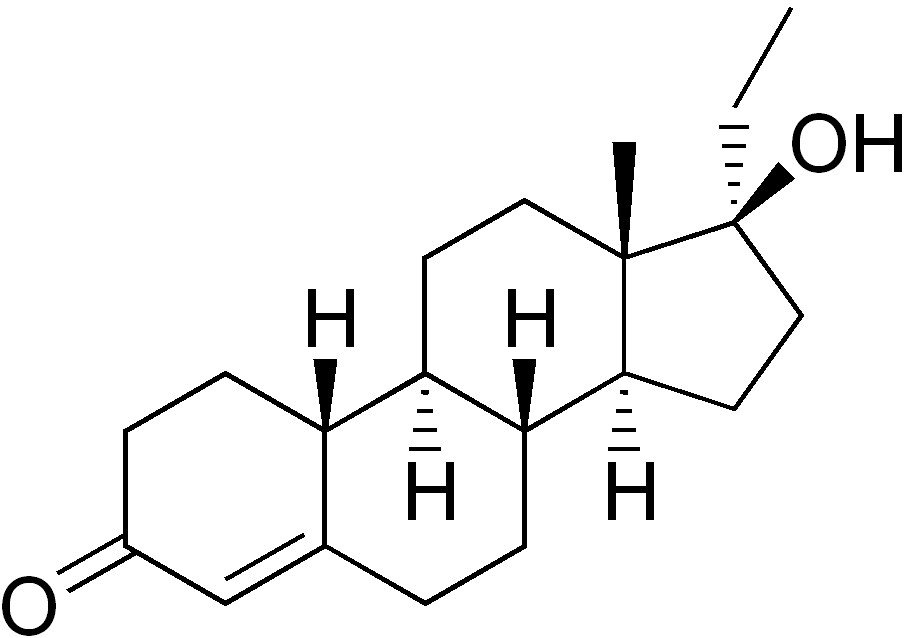
Norethandrolone (3-ketoethylestrenol), the active metabolite of ethylestrenol.

Androgenic vs. anabolic activity ratio of androgens/anabolic steroids
Medication	Ratio^{a}
Testosterone	~1:1
Androstanolone (DHT)	~1:1
Methyltestosterone	~1:1
Methandriol	~1:1
Fluoxymesterone	1:1–1:15
Metandienone	1:1–1:8
Drostanolone	1:3–1:4
Metenolone	1:2–1:3
Oxymetholone	1:2–1:9
Oxandrolone	1:13–1:3
Stanozolol	1:1–1:3
Nandrolone	1:3–1:16
Ethylestrenol	1:2–1:19
Norethandrolone	1:1–1:2
Notes: In rodents. Footnotes: ^{a} = Ratio of androgenic to anabolic activity. Sources: See template.

As an AAS, ethylestrenol is an agonist of the androgen receptor (AR), similarly to androgens like testosterone and dihydrotestosterone (DHT). It has low estrogenic activity (via aromatization into ethylestradiol following transformation into norethandrolone), strong progestogenic activity, and a high ratio of anabolic to androgenic activity, similarly to other nandrolone derivatives. Like other 17α-alkylated AAS, ethylestrenol has a risk of hepatotoxicity.

Relative affinities of nandrolone and related steroids at the androgen receptor
Compound	rAR (%)	hAR (%)
Testosterone	38	38
5α-Dihydrotestosterone	77	100
Nandrolone	75	92
5α-Dihydronandrolone	35	50
Ethylestrenol	ND	2
Norethandrolone	ND	22
5α-Dihydronorethandrolone	ND	14
Metribolone	100	110
Sources: See template.

=== Pharmacokinetics ===
Ethylestrenol has very low affinity for human serum sex hormone-binding globulin (SHBG), less than 5% of that of testosterone and less than 1% of that of DHT. It is known to be metabolized into the closely related AAS norethandrolone (17α-ethyl-19-nortestosterone) in the body and has been regarded as a prodrug of norethandrolone. This is in accordance with its very low affinity for the androgen receptor, only about 5% of that of testosterone and 2% of that of dihydrotestosterone.

== Chemistry ==
Ethylestrenol, also known as 3-deketo-17α-ethyl-19-nortestosterone or as 17α-ethylestr-4-en-17β-ol, is a synthetic estrane steroid and a 17α-alkylated derivative of nandrolone (19-nortestosterone; 19-NT). It is specifically the 17α-ethyl and 3-deketo derivative of nandrolone as well as the 3-deketo derivative of norethandrolone (17α-ethyl-19-NT). Other related AAS include bolenol (3-deketo-17α-ethyl-19-nor-5-androstenediol), ethyldienolone (17α-ethyl-δ^{9}-19-NT), norboletone (17α-ethyl-18-methyl-19-NT), propetandrol (17α-ethyl-19-NT 3β-propionate), and tetrahydrogestrinone (THG; 17α-ethyl-18-methyl-δ^{9,11}-19-NT). The progestins allylestrenol (3-deketo-17α-allyl-19-NT) and lynestrenol (3-deketo-17α-ethynyl-19-NT) are also closely related to ethylestrenol, differing only by the C17α substitution.

== History ==
Ethylestrenol was described in the literature in 1959 and approved for medical use in 1961 and in the United States in 1964.

== Society and culture ==
=== Generic names ===
Ethylestrenol is the generic name of the drug and its INN, USAN, and BAN, while éthylestrénol is its DCF and ethylnandrol is its JAN. The BAN was formerly ethyloestrenol, but it was eventually changed.

=== Brand names ===
Ethylestrenol is or has been marketed under a variety of brand names including Durabolin O, Duraboral, Fertabolin, Maxibolin, Maxibolin Elixir, Orabolin, Orgabolin, Orgaboral, and Virastine. The brand name Durabolin O is a contraction of "Durabolin Oral", Durabolin being a brand name of the nandrolone ester nandrolone phenylpropionate. Ethylestrenol is or has also been marketed for veterinary use under the brand names Nandoral, Nitrotain, and Oestrotain.

=== Availability ===
The availability of ethylestrenol is very limited. It appears to be available only in Australia and New Zealand and in these countries only for veterinary use.

=== Legal status ===
Ethylestrenol, along with other AAS, is a schedule III controlled substance in the United States under the Controlled Substances Act.
