= 5α-Dihydroethisterone =

Chemical compound

Clinical data
- Other names: HE-3562; 5α-Dihydro-17α-Ethynyltestosterone; 17α-Ethynyl-DHT; 17α-Ethynyl-5α-androstan-17β-ol-3-one; 5α,17α-Pregn-20-yn-17β-ol-3-one; Ethynylandrostanolone
- Drug class: Progestin; Progestogen; Androgen; Anabolic steroid

Identifiers
- IUPAC name: (5S,8R,9S,10S,13S,14S,17R)-17-ethynyl-17-hydroxy-10,13-dimethyl-2,4,5,6,7,8,9,11,12,14,15,16-dodecahydro-1H-cyclopenta[a]phenanthren-3-one
- CAS Number: 13611-97-7
- PubChem CID: 14887213
- ChemSpider: 23317316
- ChEMBL: ChEMBL260202

Chemical and physical data
- Formula: C_{21}H_{30}O_{2}
- Molar mass: 314.469 g·mol^{−1}
- 3D model (JSmol): Interactive image
- SMILES: C[C@]12CCC(=O)C[C@@H]1CC[C@@H]3[C@@H]2CC[C@]4([C@H]3CC[C@]4(C#C)O)C
- InChI: InChI=1S/C21H30O2/c1-4-21(23)12-9-18-16-6-5-14-13-15(22)7-10-19(14,2)17(16)8-11-20(18,21)3/h1,14,16-18,23H,5-13H2,2-3H3/t14-,16+,17-,18-,19-,20-,21-/m0/s1; Key:PVHMKHVQVIUQIP-JJFNZWTKSA-N

5α-Dihydroethisterone (5α-DHET; developmental code name HE-3562) is an active metabolite of the formerly clinically used but now-discontinued progestin ethisterone and the experimental and never-marketed hormonal antineoplastic agent ethynylandrostanediol (HE-3235). Its formation from its parent drugs is catalyzed by 5α-reductase in tissues that express the enzyme in high amounts like the liver, skin, hair follicles, and prostate gland. 5α-DHET has significant affinity for steroid hormone receptors and may contribute importantly to the activities of its parent drugs.

== Pharmacology ==
=== Pharmacodynamics ===
The affinity of 5α-DHET for the androgen receptor (AR) is relatively high, in the range of 38 to 100% of that of dihydrotestosterone (DHT). A study found that, similarly to norethisterone and its 5α-reduced metabolite 5α-dihydronorethisterone, 5α-DHET showed increased affinity for the AR but decreased androgenic potency relative to ethisterone (K_{i} = 16.1 nM for 5α-DHET and 101.1 nM for ethisterone, a 6-fold difference in affinity). The decreased androgenic activity of 5α-DHET in spite of increased affinity for the AR relative to ethisterone suggests that it has comparatively reduced efficacy as an agonist of the receptor, analogously to selective androgen receptor modulators (AR partial agonists) and antiandrogens (AR antagonists). 5α-DHET has relatively low affinity for the progesterone receptor, only about 12% of that of the progestogen progesterone. This is significantly less than that of ethisterone, which has been found to bind to the receptor with an affinity of 35% of that of progesterone. Conversely, it has relatively high affinity for the glucocorticoid receptor, about 120% of that of the corticosteroid dexamethasone. In regards to the estrogen receptors, 5α-DHET has weak affinity for the ERα of about 3.5% of that of estradiol, and does not bind to the ERβ (K_{i} > 10 μM).

In addition to steroid hormone receptors, 5α-DHET has very high affinity for sex hormone-binding globulin (K_{d} = 0.18 nM), an androgen and estrogen binding and transport protein that has the effect of intermittently inactivating steroid hormones (but also prolonging their half-life in the body). Its affinity for this protein is among the highest of any known compound and has been found to be roughly equal to that of DHT and mesterolone (1α-methyl-DHT). This property may contribute to the androgenic activity of 5α-DHET's parent drug ethisterone by displacing endogenous androgens like testosterone and DHT from SHBG.

=== Pharmacokinetics ===
Metabolism studies of ethynylandrostanediol revealed that 5α-DHET can be metabolized via C7β and C16α hydroxylation.

== Chemistry ==
5α-DHET, also known as 5α-dihydro-17α-ethynyltestosterone (17α-ethynyl-DHT) as well as 17α-ethynyl-5α-androstan-17β-ol-3-one or 5α,17α-pregn-20-yn-17β-ol-3-one, is a synthetic androstane steroid and a derivative of testosterone. It is specifically the combined derivative of 5α-dihydrotestosterone (DHT) and ethisterone (17α-ethynyltestosterone). The steroid is also closely related to ethynylandrostanediol (17α-ethynyl-5α-androstane-3α,17β-diol).

=== Analogues ===
Some closely related synthetic 5α-reduced steroid metabolites include 5α-dihydronandrolone, 5α-dihydronormethandrone, 5α-dihydronorethandrolone, 5α-dihydronorethisterone, and 5α-dihydrolevonorgestrel, as well as 19-norandrosterone and 19-noretiocholanolone.

=== Derivatives ===
The steroidal antiandrogen zanoterone (WIN-49596), which was investigated in the 1990s for the treatment of benign prostatic hyperplasia but was never marketed, was derived from 5α-DHET. In terms of chemical structure, it is 5α-DHET with a pyrazole ring-containing moiety fused at the C2 and C3 positions.

=== Synthesis ===
A partial synthesis of 5α-DHET from androstenedione has been published.
