= Metenolone =

Chemical compound

Clinical data
- Trade names: Primobolan, Nibal (as metenolone acetate); Primobolan Depot, Nibal Injection (as metenolone enanthate)
- Other names: Methenolone; Methylandrostenolone; 1-Methyl-δ^{1}-4,5α-dihydrotestosterone; 1-Methyl-δ^{1}-DHT; 1-Methyl-5α-androst-1-en-17β-ol-3-one
- AHFS/Drugs.com: International Drug Names
- Routes of administration: By mouth (as metenolone acetate), intramuscular injection (as metenolone enanthate)
- Drug class: Androgen; Anabolic steroid
- ATC code: A14AA04 (WHO)

Legal status
- Legal status: BR: Class C5 (Anabolic steroids); CA: Schedule IV; US: Schedule III

Identifiers
- IUPAC name: (5S,8R,9S,10S,13S,14S,17S)-17-hydroxy-1,10,13-trimethyl-4,5,6,7,8,9,11,12,14,15,16,17-dodecahydrocyclopenta[a]phenanthren-3-one
- CAS Number: 153-00-4
- PubChem CID: 3037705
- ChemSpider: 2301378
- UNII: 9062ZT8Q5C
- CompTox Dashboard (EPA): DTXSID10165179
- ECHA InfoCard: 100.005.285

Chemical and physical data
- Formula: C_{20}H_{30}O_{2}
- Molar mass: 302.458 g·mol^{−1}
- 3D model (JSmol): Interactive image
- SMILES: O=C2\C=C(\C)[C@@]3([C@H]1CC[C@@]4([C@@H](O)CC[C@H]4[C@@H]1CC[C@H]3C2)C)C
- InChI: InChI=1S/C20H30O2/c1-12-10-14(21)11-13-4-5-15-16-6-7-18(22)19(16,2)9-8-17(15)20(12,13)3/h10,13,15-18,22H,4-9,11H2,1-3H3/t13-,15-,16-,17-,18-,19-,20-/m0/s1; Key:ANJQEDFWRSLVBR-VHUDCFPWSA-N

Metenolone, or methenolone, is an androgen and anabolic steroid (AAS) which is used in the form of esters such as metenolone acetate (brand name Primobolan, Nibal) and metenolone enanthate (brand name Primobolan Depot, Nibal Injection). Metenolone esters are used mainly in the treatment of anemia due to bone marrow failure. Metenolone acetate is taken by mouth, while metenolone enanthate is given by injection into muscle.

Side effects of metenolone esters include symptoms of masculinization like acne, increased hair growth, voice changes, and increased sexual desire. Metenolone esters are synthetic androgens and anabolic steroids and hence are agonists of the androgen receptor (AR), the biological target of androgens like testosterone and dihydrotestosterone (DHT). They have moderate anabolic effects and weak androgenic effects, as well as no estrogenic effects or risk of liver damage. Metenolone esters are androgen esters and prodrugs of metenolone in the body.

Metenolone esters were introduced for medical use in the early 1960s. In addition to their medical use, metenolone esters are used to improve physique and performance. The drugs are controlled substances in many countries and so non-medical use is generally illicit. They have mostly been discontinued for medical use and have limited availability.

== Medical uses ==
Metenolone, as its esters, is used almost exclusively in the treatment of anemia due to bone marrow failure. It has also been used to treat wasting syndromes due to major surgery, infection, long-term corticosteroid therapy, malnutrition, or other causes. It has also been used to treat osteoporosis and sarcopenia, to inhibit the natural loss of muscle mass with aging, and to promote weight gain in underweight premature infants and children.

== Side effects ==
Side effects of metenolone and its esters include virilization among others.

== Pharmacology ==
=== Pharmacodynamics ===
Androgenic vs. anabolic activity ratio of androgens/anabolic steroids
Medication	Ratio^{a}
Testosterone	~1:1
Androstanolone (DHT)	~1:1
Methyltestosterone	~1:1
Methandriol	~1:1
Fluoxymesterone	1:1–1:15
Metandienone	1:1–1:8
Drostanolone	1:3–1:4
Metenolone	1:2–1:30
Oxymetholone	1:2–1:9
Oxandrolone	1:3–1:13
Stanozolol	1:1–1:30
Nandrolone	1:3–1:16
Ethylestrenol	1:2–1:19
Norethandrolone	1:1–1:20
Notes: In rodents. Footnotes: ^{a} = Ratio of androgenic to anabolic activity. Sources: See template.

Due to its double bond between the C1 and C2 positions, metenolone is resistant to metabolism by 3α-hydroxysteroid dehydrogenase (3α-HSD). As such, unlike DHT and the closely related DHT derivatives mestanolone (17α-methyl-DHT) and mesterolone (1α-methyl-DHT), metenolone has considerable anabolic effects.

=== Pharmacokinetics ===
Metenolone has very low affinity for human serum sex hormone-binding globulin (SHBG), about 16% of that of testosterone and 3% of that of DHT.

== Chemistry ==
Metenolone, also known as 1-methyl-4,5α-dihydro-δ^{1}-testosterone (1-methyl-δ^{1}-DHT) or as 1-methyl-5α-androst-1-en-17β-ol-3-one, is a synthetic androstane steroid and derivative of dihydrotestosterone (DHT). A closely related AAS is mesterolone (1α-methyl-DHT).

== Society and culture ==
=== Generic names ===
Metenolone is the generic name of the drug and its INN, while methenolone is its BAN. It has also been referred to as methylandrostenolone. This synonym should not be confused with methandrostenolone, which is another name for a different AAS known as metandienone.

=== Doping in sports ===
Metenolone and its esters are banned from use in sports governed by the World Anti-Doping Agency. The NBA and NBPA also banned the use of metenolone and its esters under the Anti-Drug Program. There are known cases of doping in sports with metenolone esters by professional athletes.
