= Ethisterone =

Chemical compound

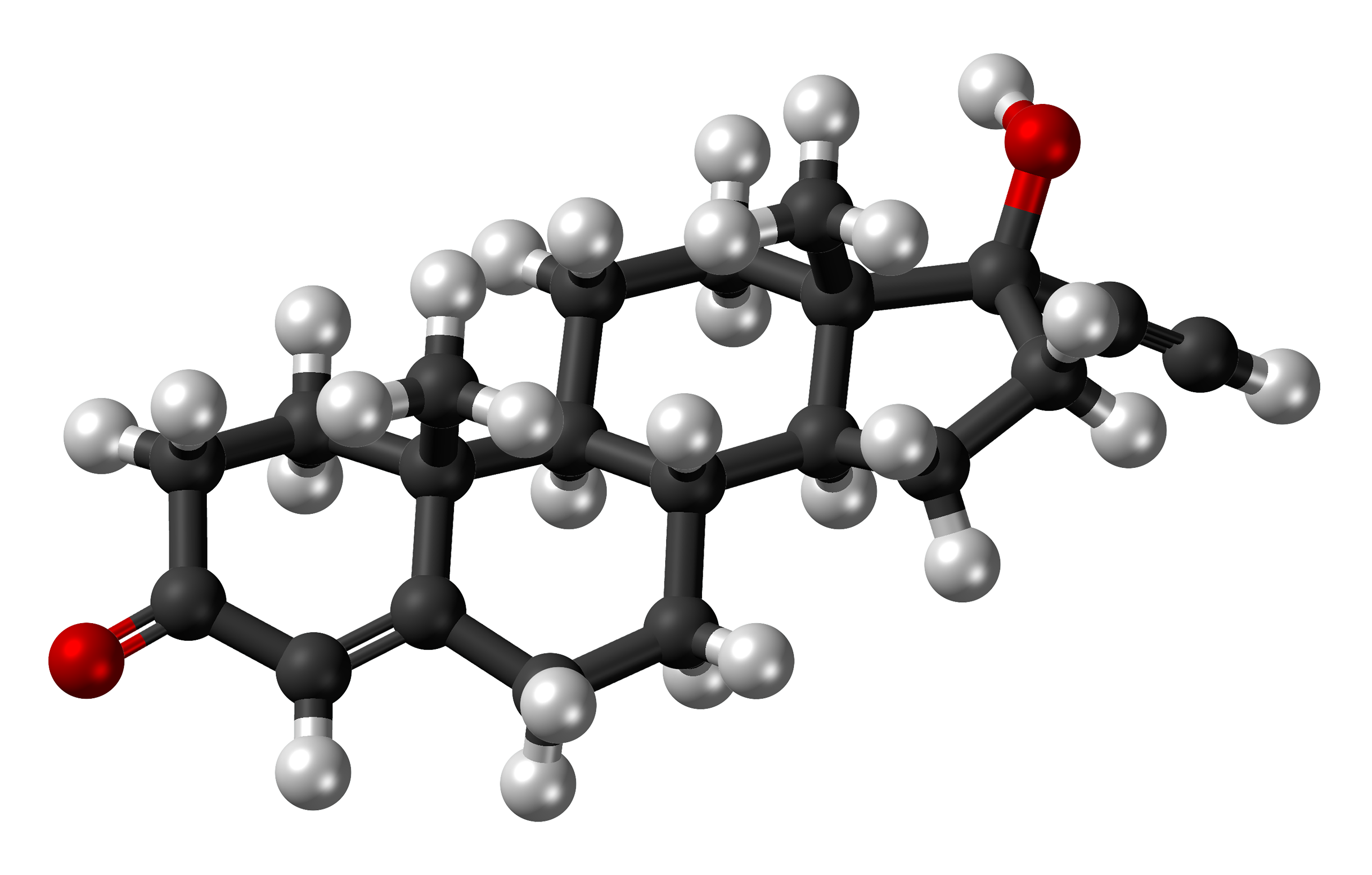

Clinical data
- Trade names: Proluton C, Pranone, others
- Other names: Ethinyltestosterone; Ethynyltestosterone; Pregneninolone; Anhydrohydroxyprogesterone; Etisteron; Pregnin; Ethindrone
- Routes of administration: By mouth, sublingual
- Drug class: Progestogen; Progestin; Androgen; Anabolic steroid
- ATC code: G03DC04 (WHO)

Pharmacokinetic data
- Metabolites: • 5α-Dihydroethisterone

Identifiers
- IUPAC name: (8R,9S,10R,13R,14S,17R)-17-Ethynyl-17-hydroxy-10,13-dimethyl-2,6,7,8,9,11,12,14,15,16-decahydro-1H-cyclopenta[a]phenanthren-3-one
- CAS Number: 434-03-7
- PubChem CID: 5284557
- ChemSpider: 4447612
- UNII: P201BVY1MJ
- ChEBI: CHEBI:34749
- ChEMBL: ChEMBL241694
- CompTox Dashboard (EPA): DTXSID2023016
- ECHA InfoCard: 100.006.452

Chemical and physical data
- Formula: C_{21}H_{28}O_{2}
- Molar mass: 312.453 g·mol^{−1}
- 3D model (JSmol): Interactive image
- SMILES: C[C@]12CCC(=O)C=C1CC[C@@H]3[C@@H]2CC[C@]4([C@H]3CC[C@]4(C#C)O)C
- InChI: InChI=1S/C21H28O2/c1-4-21(23)12-9-18-16-6-5-14-13-15(22)7-10-19(14,2)17(16)8-11-20(18,21)3/h1,13,16-18,23H,5-12H2,2-3H3/t16-,17+,18+,19+,20+,21+/m1/s1; Key:CHNXZKVNWQUJIB-CEGNMAFCSA-N

Ethisterone, also known as ethinyltestosterone, pregneninolone, and anhydrohydroxyprogesterone and formerly sold under the brand names Proluton C and Pranone among others, is a progestin medication which was used in the treatment of gynecological disorders but is now no longer available. It was used alone and was not formulated in combination with an estrogen. The medication is taken by mouth.

Side effects of ethisterone include masculinization among others. Ethisterone is a progestin, or a synthetic progestogen, and hence is an agonist of the progesterone receptor, the biological target of progestogens like progesterone. It has some androgenic and anabolic activity and no other important hormonal activity.

Ethisterone was discovered in 1938 and was introduced for medical use in Germany in 1939 and in the United States in 1945. It was the second progestogen to be marketed, following injected progesterone in 1934, and was both the first orally active progestogen and the first progestin to be introduced. Ethisterone was followed by the improved and much more widely used and known progestin norethisterone in 1957.

== Medical uses ==
Ethisterone was used in the treatment of gynecological disorders such as irregular menstruation, amenorrhea, and premenstrual syndrome.

=== Available forms ===
Ethisterone was available in the form of 5, 10, and 25 mg oral and sublingual tablets, as well as 50, 100, and 250 mg oral capsules. The usual dosage was 25 mg, up to four times per day.

== Side effects ==
Side effects of ethisterone reportedly include symptoms of masculinization such as acne and hirsutism among others. Findings are mixed on the anabolic effects of high doses of ethisterone.

== Pharmacology ==
=== Pharmacodynamics ===
Ethisterone has weak progestogenic activity and weak androgenic activity, but does not seem to have estrogenic activity.

Ethisterone is a major active metabolite of danazol (2,3-isoxazolethisterone), and is thought to contribute importantly to its effects.

==== Progestogenic activity ====
Ethisterone is a progestogen, or an agonist of the progesterone receptors. It has about 44% of the affinity of progesterone for the progesterone receptor. The medication is described as a relatively weak progestogen, similarly to its analogue dimethisterone. Its total endometrial transformation dosage per 10 to 14 days in women is 200 to 700 mg. Ethisterone has about 20-fold lower potency as a progestogen relative to norethisterone. It is said to have minimal antigonadotropic effect and to not suppress ovulation, which has precluded its use in hormonal contraception.

==== Androgenic activity ====
Based on in vitro research, ethisterone and norethisterone are about equipotent in their EC_{50} values for activation of the androgen receptor (AR), whereas, conversely, norethisterone shows markedly increased potency relative to ethisterone in terms of its EC_{50} for the progesterone receptor. As such, there is a considerable separation in the ratios of androgenic and progestogenic activity for ethisterone and norethisterone. Moreover, at the larger dosages in which it is used to achieve equivalent progestogenic effect, ethisterone has more androgenic effect relative to norethisterone and other 19-nortestosterone progestins. However, the androgenic activity of ethisterone has in any case been described as weak. Due to its androgenic activity, ethisterone has been associated with the masculinization of female fetuses in women who have taken it during pregnancy. The 5α-reduced metabolite of ethisterone, 5α-dihydroethisterone, has been found to show reduced androgenic activity relative to ethisterone. Interestingly, ethisterone showed antiandrogenic activity when co-administered with dihydrotestosterone (DHT) in animals, whereas 5α-dihydroethisterone did not.

==== Estrogenic activity ====
Testosterone is aromatized into estradiol, and norethisterone, the 19-nortestosterone analogue of ethisterone, has similarly been shown to be aromatized into ethinylestradiol. In accordance, high doses of norethisterone have been found to be associated with marked increases in urinary estrogen excretion (due to metabolism into ethinylestradiol), as well as with high rates of estrogenic side effects such as breast enlargement in women and gynecomastia in men and improvement of menopausal symptoms in postmenopausal women. In contrast, ethisterone and other progestogens such as progesterone and hydroxyprogesterone caproate do not increase estrogen excretion and are not associated with estrogenic effects, indicating that they have little or no estrogenic activity. Similarly, although ethisterone showed estrogenic effects in the uterus and vagina in rats, few or no such effects were observed in women treated with the medication, even at very high doses. As such, ethisterone does not appear to share the estrogenic activity of norethisterone, at least in humans. Aside from ethinylestradiol, 17α-ethynyl-3α-androstanediol and 17α-ethynyl-3β-androstanediol may be estrogenic metabolites of ethisterone.

=== Pharmacokinetics ===
==== Absorption ====
Ethisterone is active both orally and sublingually in humans. Good oral bioavailability of ethisterone has been observed in rats. The medication was the first orally active progestin to be discovered and introduced for clinical use.

==== Distribution ====
Ethisterone has relatively high affinity for sex hormone-binding globulin, about 14% of that of dihydrotestosterone and 49% of that of testosterone in one study.

==== Metabolism ====
In terms of metabolism, ethisterone is not converted into pregnanediol in humans. This indicates that it is not metabolized into progesterone. No aromatization of ethisterone has been detected in vivo, and no estrogenic metabolites were observed in vitro upon incubation of ethisterone in placental homogenates. This suggests that ethisterone may not be transformed into ethinylestradiol (17α-ethynylestradiol). 5α-Dihydroethisterone (5α-dihydro-17α-ethynyltestosterone), formed by 5α-reductase, is an active metabolite of ethisterone. 17α-Ethynyl-3α-androstanediol and 17α-ethynyl-3β-androstanediol, also formed via 5α-reductase, as well as other enzymes, are also potential metabolites of ethisterone.

== Chemistry ==
Ethisterone is a synthetic androstane steroid which was derived from testosterone and is also known by the following synonyms:

- 17α-Ethynyltestosterone (or simply ethinyltestosterone or ethynyltestosterone)
- 17α-Ethynylandrost-4-en-17β-ol-3-one
- 17α-Pregn-4-en-20-yn-17β-ol-3-one (or simply pregneninolone or pregnenynolone)
- 20,21-Anhydro-17β-hydroxyprogesterone (or simply anhydrohydroxyprogesterone)

Closely related analogues of ethisterone include dimethisterone (6α,21-dimethylethisterone), norethisterone (19-norethisterone), and danazol (the 2,3-d-isoxazole ring-fused derivative of ethisterone), as well as vinyltestosterone, allyltestosterone, methyltestosterone, ethyltestosterone, and propyltestosterone. Other ethisterone analogues include ethinylandrostenediol (17α-ethynyl-5-androstenediol), ethandrostate (17α-ethynyl-5-androstenediol 3β-cyclohexylpropionate), 17α-ethynyl-3α-androstanediol, and 17α-ethynyl-3β-androstanediol.

=== Synthesis ===
Chemical syntheses of ethisterone have been published.

== History ==
Ethisterone was synthesized in 1938 by Hans Herloff Inhoffen, Willy Logemann, Walter Hohlweg, and Arthur Serini at Schering AG in Berlin. It was derived from testosterone via ethynylation at the C17α position, and it was hoped, that, analogously to estradiol and ethinylestradiol, ethisterone would be an orally active form of testosterone. However, the androgenic activity of ethisterone was attenuated and it showed considerable progestogenic activity. As such, it was developed as a progestogen instead and was introduced for medical use in Germany in 1939 as Proluton C and by Schering in the United States in 1945 as Pranone. Ethisterone remained in use as late as 2000.

== Society and culture ==
=== Generic names ===
Ethisterone is the generic name of the drug and its INN, USAN, and BAN, while ethistérone is its DCF. It has also been referred to as ethinyltestosterone, pregneninolone, and anhydrohydroxyprogesterone.

=== Brand names ===
Ethisterone has been marketed under a variety of brand names including Amenoren, Cycloestrol-AH Progestérone, Duosterone, Estormon, Etherone, Ethisteron, Luteosterone, Lutocyclin, Lutocylol, Lutogynestryl, Menstrogen, Nugestoral, Oophormin Luteum, Ora-Lutin, Orasecron, Pranone, Pre Ciclo, Prodroxan, Produxan, Progestab, Progesteron lingvalete, Progestoral, Proluton C, Syngestrotabs, and Trosinone among others.

=== Availability ===
Ethisterone was previously available in France, Germany, Italy, Japan, the United Kingdom, and the United States, among other countries. It is no longer marketed and hence is no longer available in any country.
