= Metandienone =

Androgen and anabolic steroid

Clinical data
- Trade names: Dianabol, others
- Other names: Methandienone; Methandrostenolone; Methandrolone; Dehydromethyltestosterone; Methylboldenone; Perabol; Ciba-17309-Ba; TMV-17; NSC-51180; NSC-42722; 17α-Methyl-δ^{1}-testosterone; 17β-Hydroxy-17α-methylandrosta-1,4-dien-3-one; 17α-Methylandrost-1,4-dien-17β-ol-3-one
- Routes of administration: By mouth, intramuscular injection (veterinary)
- Drug class: Androgen; Anabolic steroid
- ATC code: A14AA03 (WHO) D11AE01 (WHO)

Legal status
- Legal status: AU: S4 (Prescription only); BR: Class C5 (Anabolic steroids); CA: Schedule IV; US: Schedule III

Pharmacokinetic data
- Bioavailability: High
- Metabolism: Hepatic
- Elimination half-life: 3–6 hours
- Excretion: Urine

Identifiers
- CAS Number: 72-63-9
- PubChem CID: 6300
- DrugBank: DB13586
- ChemSpider: 6061
- UNII: COZ1R7EOCC
- KEGG: D00389
- ChEMBL: ChEMBL1418176
- CompTox Dashboard (EPA): DTXSID2023276
- ECHA InfoCard: 100.000.716

Chemical and physical data
- Formula: C_{20}H_{28}O_{2}
- Molar mass: 300.442 g·mol^{−1}
- 3D model (JSmol): Interactive image
- SMILES: O=C\1\C=C/[C@]4(/C(=C/1)CC[C@@H]3[C@@H]4CC[C@]2([C@H]3CC[C@@]2(O)C)C)C
- InChI: InChI=1S/C20H28O2/c1-18-9-6-14(21)12-13(18)4-5-15-16(18)7-10-19(2)17(15)8-11-20(19,3)22/h6,9,12,15-17,22H,4-5,7-8,10-11H2,1-3H3/t15-,16+,17+,18+,19+,20+/m1/s1; Key:XWALNWXLMVGSFR-HLXURNFRSA-N
- S,9S,10S,13S,14S,17S)-17-Hydroxy-10,13,17-trimethyl-7,8,9,11,12,14,15,16-octahydro-6H-cyclopenta[aphenanthren-3-one&page2=Metandienone (verify)]

Metandienone, also known as methandienone or methandrostenolone and sold under the brand name Dianabol (D-Bol) among others, is an androgen and anabolic steroid (AAS) medication which is mostly no longer prescribed. It is also used non-medically for physique- and performance-enhancing purposes. It is often taken by mouth.

Side effects of metandienone include symptoms of masculinization like acne, increased hair growth, voice changes, and increased sexual desire, estrogenic effects like fluid retention and breast enlargement, and liver damage. The drug is an agonist of the androgen receptor (AR), the biological target of androgens like testosterone and dihydrotestosterone (DHT), and has strong anabolic effects and moderate androgenic effects. It also has moderate estrogenic effects.

Metandienone was originally developed in 1955 by CIBA and marketed in Germany and the United States. As the CIBA product Dianabol, metandienone quickly became the first widely used AAS among professional and amateur athletes, and remains the most common orally active AAS for non-medical use. It is currently a controlled substance in the United States and United Kingdom and remains popular among bodybuilders. Metandienone is readily available without a prescription in certain countries such as Mexico, and is also manufactured in some Asian countries.

== Medical uses ==
Metandienone was formerly approved and marketed as a form of androgen replacement therapy for the treatment of hypogonadism in men, but has since been discontinued and withdrawn in most countries, including in the United States.

It was given at a dosage of 5 to 10 mg/day in men and 2.5 mg/day in women.

Androgen replacement therapy formulations and dosages used in men
Route	Medication	Major brand names	Form	Dosage
Oral	Testosterone^{a}	–	Tablet	400–800 mg/day (in divided doses)
Oral	Testosterone undecanoate	Andriol, Jatenzo, Kyzatrex	Capsule	40–80 mg/2–4× day (with meals)
Oral	Methyltestosterone^{b}	Android, Metandren, Testred	Tablet	10–50 mg/day
Oral	Fluoxymesterone^{b}	Halotestin, Ora-Testryl, Ultandren	Tablet	5–20 mg/day
Oral	Metandienone^{b}	Dianabol	Tablet	5–15 mg/day
Oral	Mesterolone^{b}	Proviron	Tablet	25–150 mg/day
Sublingual	Testosterone^{b}	Testoral	Tablet	5–10 mg 1–4×/day
Sublingual	Methyltestosterone^{b}	Metandren, Oreton Methyl	Tablet	10–30 mg/day
Buccal	Testosterone	Striant	Tablet	30 mg 2×/day
Buccal	Methyltestosterone^{b}	Metandren, Oreton Methyl	Tablet	5–25 mg/day
Transdermal	Testosterone	AndroGel, Testim, TestoGel	Gel	25–125 mg/day
Transdermal	Testosterone	Androderm, AndroPatch, TestoPatch	Non-scrotal patch	2.5–15 mg/day
Transdermal	Testosterone	Testoderm	Scrotal patch	4–6 mg/day
Transdermal	Testosterone	Axiron	Axillary solution	30–120 mg/day
Transdermal	Androstanolone (DHT)	Andractim	Gel	100–250 mg/day
Rectal	Testosterone	Rektandron, Testosteron^{b}	Suppository	40 mg 2–3×/day
Injection (IM or SC)	Testosterone	Andronaq, Sterotate, Virosterone	Aqueous suspension	10–50 mg 2–3×/week
Injection (IM or SC)	Testosterone propionate^{b}	Testoviron	Oil solution	10–50 mg 2–3×/week
Injection (IM or SC)	Testosterone enanthate	Delatestryl	Oil solution	50–250 mg 1x/1–4 weeks
Injection (IM or SC)	Testosterone enanthate	Xyosted	Auto-injector	50–100 mg 1×/week
Injection (IM or SC)	Testosterone cypionate	Depo-Testosterone	Oil solution	50–250 mg 1x/1–4 weeks
Injection (IM or SC)	Testosterone isobutyrate	Agovirin Depot	Aqueous suspension	50–100 mg 1x/1–2 weeks
Injection (IM or SC)	Testosterone phenylacetate^{b}	Perandren, Androject	Oil solution	50–200 mg 1×/3–5 weeks
Injection (IM or SC)	Mixed testosterone esters	Sustanon 100, Sustanon 250	Oil solution	50–250 mg 1×/2–4 weeks
Injection (IM or SC)	Testosterone undecanoate	Aveed, Nebido	Oil solution	750–1,000 mg 1×/10–14 weeks
Injection (IM or SC)	Testosterone buciclate^{a}	–	Aqueous suspension	600–1,000 mg 1×/12–20 weeks
Implant	Testosterone	Testopel	Pellet	150–1,200 mg/3–6 months
Notes: Men produce about 3 to 11 mg of testosterone per day (mean 7 mg/day in young men). Footnotes: ^{a} = Never marketed. ^{b} = No longer used and/or no longer marketed. Sources: See template.

=== Available forms ===
Metandienone was provided in the form of 2.5, 5 and 10 mg oral tablets.

== Non-medical uses ==
Metandienone is used for physique- and performance-enhancing purposes by competitive athletes, bodybuilders, and powerlifters. It is said to be the most widely used AAS for such purposes both today and historically.

== Side effects ==
Androgenic side effects such as oily skin, acne, seborrhea, increased facial/body hair growth, scalp hair loss, and virilization may occur. Estrogenic side effects such as gynecomastia and fluid retention can also occur. Case reports of gynecomastia exist. As with other 17α-alkylated steroids, methandienone poses a risk of hepatotoxicity and use over extended periods of time can result in liver damage without appropriate precautions.

== Pharmacology ==
=== Pharmacodynamics ===
Androgenic vs. anabolic activity ratio of androgens/anabolic steroids
Medication	Ratio^{a}
Testosterone	~1:1
Androstanolone (DHT)	~1:1
Methyltestosterone	~1:1
Methandriol	~1:1
Fluoxymesterone	1:1–1:15
Metandienone	1:1–1:8
Drostanolone	1:3–1:4
Metenolone	1:2–1:3
Oxymetholone	1:2–1:9
Oxandrolone	1:13–1:3
Stanozolol	1:1–1:3
Nandrolone	1:3–1:16
Ethylestrenol	1:2–1:19
Norethandrolone	1:1–1:2
Notes: In rodents. Footnotes: ^{a} = Ratio of androgenic to anabolic activity. Sources: See template.

Methandienone binds to and activates the androgen receptor (AR) in order to exert its effects. These include dramatic increases in protein synthesis, glycogenolysis, and muscle strength over a short space of time. While it can be metabolized by 5α-reductase into methyl-1-testosterone (17α-methyl-δ^{1}-DHT), a more potent AAS, the drug has extremely low affinity for this enzyme and methyl-1-testosterone is thus produced in only trace amounts. As such, 5α-reductase inhibitors like finasteride and dutasteride do not reduce the androgenic effects of metandienone. Nonetheless, while the ratio of anabolic to androgenic activity of metandienone is improved relative to that of testosterone, the drug does still possess moderate androgenic activity and is capable of producing severe virilization in women and children. As such, it is only really commonly used in men.

Metandienone is a substrate for aromatase and can be metabolized into the estrogen methylestradiol (17α-methylestradiol). While the rate of aromatization is reduced relative to that for testosterone or methyltestosterone, the estrogen produced is metabolism-resistant and hence metandienone retains moderate estrogenic activity. As such, it can cause side effects such as gynecomastia and fluid retention. The co-administration of an antiestrogen such as an aromatase inhibitor like anastrozole or a selective estrogen receptor modulator like tamoxifen can reduce or prevent such estrogenic side effects. Metandienone has no progestogenic activity.

As with other 17α-alkylated AAS, metandienone may be hepatotoxic, especially with prolonged use of high doses.

=== Pharmacokinetics ===
Metandienone has high oral bioavailability. It has very low affinity for human serum sex hormone-binding globulin (SHBG), about 10% of that of testosterone and 2% of that of DHT. The drug is metabolized in the liver by 6β-hydroxylation, 3α- and 3β-oxidation, 5β-reduction, 17-epimerization, and conjugation among other reactions. Unlike methyltestosterone, owing to the presence of its C1(2) double bond, metandienone does not produce 5α-reduced metabolites. The elimination half-life of metandienone is about 3 to 6 hours. It is eliminated in the urine.

== Chemistry ==
Metandienone, also known as 17α-methyl-δ^{1}-testosterone or as 17α-methylandrost-1,4-dien-17β-ol-3-one, is a synthetic androstane steroid and a 17α-alkylated derivative of testosterone. It is a modification of testosterone with a methyl group at the C17α position and an additional double bond between the C1 and C2 positions. The drug is also the 17α-methylated derivative of boldenone (δ^{1}-testosterone) and the δ^{1} analogue of methyltestosterone (17α-methyltestosterone).

=== Detection in body fluids ===
Metandienone is subject to extensive hepatic biotransformation by a variety of enzymatic pathways. The primary urinary metabolites are detectable for up to 3 days, and a recently discovered hydroxymethyl metabolite is found in urine for up to 19 days after a single 5 mg oral dose. Several of the metabolites are unique to metandienone. Methods for detection in urine specimens usually involve gas chromatography-mass spectrometry.

== History ==
Metandienone was first described in 1955. It was synthesized by researchers at the CIBA laboratories in Basel, Switzerland. CIBA filed for a U.S. patent in 1957, and began marketing the drug as Dianabol in 1958 in the U.S. It was initially prescribed to burn victims and the elderly. It was also prescribed off-label as a pharmaceutical performance enhancement to weight lifters and other athletes. Early adopters included players for Oklahoma University and San Diego Chargers head coach Sid Gillman, who administered Dianabol to his team starting in 1963.

After the Kefauver Harris Amendment was passed in 1962, the U.S. FDA began the DESI review process to ensure the safety and efficacy of drugs approved under the more lenient pre-1962 standards, including Dianabol. In 1965, the FDA pressured CIBA to further document its legitimate medical uses, and re-approved the drug for treating post-menopausal osteoporosis and pituitary-deficient dwarfism. After CIBA's patent exclusivity period lapsed, other manufacturers began to market generic metandienone in the U.S.

Following further FDA pressure, CIBA withdrew Dianabol from the U.S. market in 1983. Generic production shut down two years later, when the FDA revoked metandienone's approval entirely in 1985. Non-medical use was outlawed in the U.S. under the Anabolic Steroids Control Act of 1990. While metandienone is controlled and no longer medically available in the U.S., it continues to be produced and used medically in some other countries.

== Society and culture ==
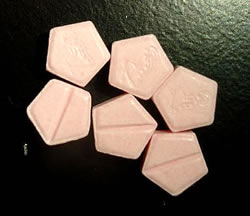
Metandienone confiscated by the Drug Enforcement Administration (DEA) in 2008.

=== Generic names ===
Metandienone is the generic name of the drug and its INN, while methandienone is its BAN and métandiénone is its DCF. It is also referred to as methandrostenolone and as dehydromethyltestosterone. The former synonym should not be confused with methylandrostenolone, which is another name for a different AAS known as metenolone.

=== Brand names ===
Metandienone was introduced and formerly sold primarily under the brand name Dianabol. It has also been marketed under a variety of other brand names including Anabol, Averbol, Chinlipan, Danabol, Dronabol, Metanabol, Methandon, Naposim, Reforvit-B, and Vetanabol among others.

=== Legal status ===
Metandienone, along with other AAS, is a schedule III controlled substance in the United States under the Controlled Substances Act.

=== Doping in sports ===
There are many known cases of doping in sports with metandienone by professional athletes.
