= 5α-Dihydronorethandrolone =

Chemical compound

Clinical data
- Other names: 5α-DHNED; 4,5α-Dihydronorethandrolone; 3-Keto-5α-dihydroethylestrenol; 17α-Ethyl-5α-dihydro-19-nortestosterone; 17α-Ethyl-5α-estran-17β-ol-3-one; 19-Nor-5α-pregnan-17α-ol-3-one

Identifiers
- IUPAC name: (5S,8R,9R,10S,13S,14S,17S)-17-Ethyl-17-hydroxy-13-methyl-1,2,4,5,6,7,8,9,10,11,12,14,15,16-tetradecahydrocyclopenta[a]phenanthren-3-one
- CAS Number: 2099-68-5
- PubChem CID: 71316183
- ChemSpider: 48063897
- UNII: UYA5MB8CXL
- CompTox Dashboard (EPA): DTXSID50747650

Chemical and physical data
- Formula: C_{20}H_{32}O_{2}
- Molar mass: 304.474 g·mol^{−1}
- 3D model (JSmol): Interactive image
- SMILES: CC[C@@]1(CC[C@@H]2[C@@]1(CC[C@H]3[C@H]2CC[C@@H]4[C@@H]3CCC(=O)C4)C)O
- InChI: InChI=1S/C20H32O2/c1-3-20(22)11-9-18-17-6-4-13-12-14(21)5-7-15(13)16(17)8-10-19(18,20)2/h13,15-18,22H,3-12H2,1-2H3/t13-,15-,16+,17+,18-,19-,20-/m0/s1; Key:IOLODVBMNDJVOP-XDQPPUBWSA-N

5α-Dihydronorethandrolone (5α-DHNED), also known as 17α-ethyl-4,5α-dihydro-19-nortestosterone or as 17α-ethyl-5α-estran-17β-ol-3-one, is an androgen/anabolic steroid and a metabolite of norethandrolone (as well as of the prodrug ethylestrenol) formed by 5α-reductase. Analogously to nandrolone and its 5α-reduced metabolite 5α-dihydronandrolone, 5α-DHNED shows reduced affinity for the androgen receptor relative to norethandrolone. Its affinity for the androgen receptor is specifically about 64% of that of norethandrolone.

Relative affinities of nandrolone and related steroids at the androgen receptor
Compound	rAR (%)	hAR (%)
Testosterone	38	38
5α-Dihydrotestosterone	77	100
Nandrolone	75	92
5α-Dihydronandrolone	35	50
Ethylestrenol	ND	2
Norethandrolone	ND	22
5α-Dihydronorethandrolone	ND	14
Metribolone	100	110
Sources: See template.

== See also ==
- 5α-Dihydronormethandrone
- 5α-Dihydronorethisterone
- 5α-Dihydrolevonorgestrel
- Ethylestradiol
