= 5α-Dihydronandrolone =

Chemical compound

Clinical data
- Other names: Dihydronandrolone; DHN; 5α-DHN; 5α-Dihydro-19-nortestosterone; 5α-Estran-17β-ol-3-one; 19-nor-5α-androstan-17β-ol-3-one

Identifiers
- IUPAC name: (5S,8R,9R,10S,13S,14S,17S)-17-Hydroxy-13-methyl-2,4,5,6,7,8,9,10,11,12,14,15,16,17-tetradecahydro-1H-cyclopenta[a]phenanthren-3-one
- CAS Number: 1434-85-1
- PubChem CID: 94202
- ChemSpider: 85015
- UNII: I0V6O3097Q
- ChEMBL: ChEMBL3137999
- CompTox Dashboard (EPA): DTXSID60931866

Chemical and physical data
- Formula: C_{18}H_{28}O_{2}
- Molar mass: 276.420 g·mol^{−1}
- 3D model (JSmol): Interactive image
- SMILES: C[C@]12CC[C@H]3[C@H]([C@@H]1CC[C@@H]2O)CC[C@@H]4[C@@H]3CCC(=O)C4
- InChI: InChI=1S/C18H28O2/c1-18-9-8-14-13-5-3-12(19)10-11(13)2-4-15(14)16(18)6-7-17(18)20/h11,13-17,20H,2-10H2,1H3/t11-,13-,14+,15+,16-,17-,18-/m0/s1; Key:RHVBIEJVJWNXBU-PNOKGRBDSA-N

5α-Dihydronandrolone (also known as 5α-DHN, dihydronandrolone, DHN, 5α-dihydro-19-nortestosterone, or 5α-estran-17β-ol-3-one) is a naturally occurring anabolic–androgenic steroid (AAS) and a 5α-reduced derivative of nandrolone (19-nortestosterone). It is a major metabolite of nandrolone and is formed from it by the actions of the enzyme 5α-reductase analogously to the formation of dihydrotestosterone (DHT) from testosterone.

When testosterone is 5α-reduced into DHT, which is a much more potent AAS in comparison, its effects are potentiated on a local level. The tissues in which this occurs (i.e., the tissues that express 5α-reductase) are referred to as "androgenic" tissues and include the skin, hair follicles, and prostate gland, among others. The conversion of testosterone into DHT is an important factor in the etiology of a variety of androgen-dependent conditions, including acne, excessive facial/body hair growth, scalp hair loss, prostate enlargement, and prostate cancer. Unlike the case of testosterone and DHT, 5α-DHN is a much weaker agonist of the androgen receptor (AR) than is nandrolone. For this reason, instead of local potentiation in androgenic tissues, there is a local inactivation when nandrolone is converted into 5α-DHN by 5α-reductase in these tissues. This is thought to be largely or completely responsible for the exceptionally high ratio of anabolic to androgenic effects seen with nandrolone.

The combination of nandrolone with a 5α-reductase inhibitor like finasteride or dutasteride will block the conversion of nandrolone into 5α-DHN and, unlike with testosterone and various other AAS, thereby considerably increase the propensity of nandrolone for producing androgenic side effects.

Relative affinities of nandrolone and related steroids at the androgen receptor
Compound	rAR (%)	hAR (%)
Testosterone	38	38
5α-Dihydrotestosterone	77	100
Nandrolone	75	92
5α-Dihydronandrolone	35	50
Ethylestrenol	ND	2
Norethandrolone	ND	22
5α-Dihydronorethandrolone	ND	14
Metribolone	100	110
Sources: See template.

== See also ==
- 19-Norandrosterone
- 19-Noretiocholanolone
- 5α-Dihydronorethandrolone
- 5α-Dihydronorethisterone
- 5α-Dihydrolevonorgestrel
- 5α-Dihydroethisterone
