= ATC code A14 =

ATC code A14 Anabolic agents for systemic use is a therapeutic subgroup of the Anatomical Therapeutic Chemical Classification System, a system of alphanumeric codes developed by the World Health Organization (WHO) for the classification of drugs and other medical products. Subgroup A14 is part of the anatomical group A Alimentary tract and metabolism.

Codes for veterinary use (ATCvet codes) can be created by placing the letter Q in front of the human ATC code: for example, QA14.
National versions of the ATC classification may include additional codes not present in this list, which follows the WHO version.

== A14A Anabolic steroids ==
=== A14AA Androstan derivatives ===
A14AA01 Androstanolone
A14AA02 Stanozolol
A14AA03 Metandienone
A14AA04 Metenolone
A14AA05 Oxymetholone
A14AA06 Quinbolone
A14AA07 Prasterone
A14AA08 Oxandrolone
A14AA09 Norethandrolone

=== A14AB Estren derivatives ===
A14AB01 Nandrolone
A14AB02 Ethylestrenol
A14AB03 Oxabolone cipionate
