= Ethylestradiol =

Chemical compound

Clinical data
- Other names: 17α-Ethylestradiol; 17α-Ethylestra-1,3,5(10)-triene-3,17β-diol
- Drug class: Estrogen

Identifiers
- IUPAC name: (8R,9S,13S,14S,17S)-17-Ethyl-13-methyl-7,8,9,11,12,14,15,16-octahydro-6H-cyclopenta[a]phenanthrene-3,17-diol
- CAS Number: 2553-34-6
- PubChem CID: 66428
- ChemSpider: 59801
- UNII: JL3XDL8DYL
- ChEMBL: ChEMBL1627625
- CompTox Dashboard (EPA): DTXSID10948429

Chemical and physical data
- Formula: C_{20}H_{28}O_{2}
- Molar mass: 300.442 g·mol^{−1}
- 3D model (JSmol): Interactive image
- SMILES: CC[C@@]1(CC[C@@H]2[C@@]1(CC[C@H]3[C@H]2CCC4=C3C=CC(=C4)O)C)O
- InChI: InChI=1S/C20H28O2/c1-3-20(22)11-9-18-17-6-4-13-12-14(21)5-7-15(13)16(17)8-10-19(18,20)2/h5,7,12,16-18,21-22H,3-4,6,8-11H2,1-2H3/t16-,17-,18+,19+,20+/m1/s1; Key:GQHYKMYMSVJXJM-SLHNCBLASA-N

Ethylestradiol, or 17α-ethylestradiol, also known as 17α-ethylestra-1,3,5(10)-triene-3,17β-diol, is a synthetic estrogen which was never marketed. It occurs as an active metabolite of the anabolic steroids norethandrolone and ethylestrenol formed via aromatase and is believed to be responsible for the estrogenic effects of norethandrolone and ethylestrenol. The 3-methyl ether of ethylestradiol has been used as an intermediate in the synthesis of certain 19-nortestosterone anabolic steroids, Norethandrolone in particular.

== See also ==
- List of estrogens
- 5α-Dihydronorethandrolone
