= 5α-Dihydrolevonorgestrel =

Chemical compound

Clinical data
- Other names: 5α-Dihydrolevonorgestrel; 5α-DHLNG; 5α-LNG

Identifiers
- IUPAC name: (5S,8R,9R,10S,13S,14S,17R)-13-Ethyl-17-ethynyl-17-hydroxy-1,2,4,5,6,7,8,9,10,11,12,14,15,16-tetradecahydrocyclopenta[a]phenanthren-3-one
- CAS Number: 78088-19-4
- PubChem CID: 9995794
- ChemSpider: 8171375
- UNII: 7Z4S6960I5
- CompTox Dashboard (EPA): DTXSID201180481

Chemical and physical data
- Formula: C_{21}H_{30}O_{2}
- Molar mass: 314.469 g·mol^{−1}
- 3D model (JSmol): Interactive image
- SMILES: CC[C@]12CC[C@H]3[C@H]([C@@H]1CC[C@]2(C#C)O)CC[C@@H]4[C@@H]3CCC(=O)C4
- InChI: InChI=1S/C21H30O2/c1-3-20-11-9-17-16-8-6-15(22)13-14(16)5-7-18(17)19(20)10-12-21(20,23)4-2/h2,14,16-19,23H,3,5-13H2,1H3/t14-,16-,17+,18+,19-,20-,21-/m0/s1; Key:BMVIRDJAPBCAPQ-WQGSDSCCSA-N

5α-Dihydrolevonorgestrel (5α-DHLNG) is an active metabolite of the progestin levonorgestrel which is formed by 5α-reductase. It has about one-third of the affinity of levonorgestrel for the progesterone receptor. In contrast to levonorgestrel, the compound has both progestogenic and antiprogestogenic activity, and hence has a selective progesterone receptor modulator-like profile of activity. This is analogous to the case of norethisterone and 5α-dihydronorethisterone. In addition to the progesterone receptor, 5α-DHLNG interacts with the androgen receptor. It has similar affinity for the androgen receptor relative to levonorgestrel (34.3% of that of metribolone for levonorgestrel and 38.0% of that of metribolone for 5α-DHLNG), and has androgenic effects similarly to levonorgestrel and testosterone. 5α-DHLNG is further transformed into 3α,5α- and 3β,5α-THLNG, which bind weakly to the estrogen receptor (0.4 to 2.4% of the RBA of E2) and have weak estrogenic activity. These metabolites are considered to be responsible for the weak estrogenic activity of high doses of levonorgestrel.

Relative affinities (%) of levonorgestrel and metabolites
Compound	PR	AR	ER	GR	MR	SHBG	CBG
Levonorgestrel	150–162	34^{a}, 45	0	1–8	17–75	50	0
5α-Dihydrolevonorgestrel	50	38^{a}	0	?	?	?	?
3α,5α-Tetrahydrolevonorgestrel	?	?	0.4	?	?	?	?
3β,5α-Tetrahydrolevonorgestrel	?	?	2.4	?	?	?	?
Notes: Values are percentages (%). Reference ligands (100%) were promegestone for the PR, metribolone (^{a} = mibolerone) for the AR, E2 for the ER, DEXA for the GR, aldosterone for the MR, DHT for SHBG, and cortisol for CBG. Sources: See template.

== See also ==
- 5α-Dihydronorethisterone
- 5α-Dihydroethisterone
- 5α-Dihydronandrolone
- 5α-Dihydronormethandrone
