= Drostanolone =

Chemical compound

Clinical data
- Trade names: Drolban, Masteril, Masteron, others (all as drostanolone propionate)
- Other names: Dromostanolone; 2α-Methyl-4,5α-dihydrotestosterone; 2α-Methyl-DHT; 2α-Methyl-5α-androstan-17β-ol-3-one
- Routes of administration: Intramuscular injection (as drostanolone propionate)
- Drug class: Androgen; Anabolic steroid

Legal status
- Legal status: BR: Class C5 (Anabolic steroids); CA: Schedule IV; US: Schedule III

Identifiers
- IUPAC name: (2R,5S,8R,9S,10S,13S,14S,17S)-17-hydroxy- 2,10,13-trimethyl-1,2,4,5,6,7,8,9,11,12,14,15,16,17- tetradecahydrocyclopenta[a]phenanthren-3-one
- CAS Number: 58-19-5
- PubChem CID: 6011
- DrugBank: DB00858
- ChemSpider: 5789
- UNII: 7DR7H00HDT
- ChEMBL: ChEMBL1582
- CompTox Dashboard (EPA): DTXSID6022971
- ECHA InfoCard: 100.000.334

Chemical and physical data
- Formula: C_{20}H_{32}O_{2}
- Molar mass: 304.474 g·mol^{−1}
- 3D model (JSmol): Interactive image
- SMILES: C[C@@H]1C[C@]2([C@@H](CC[C@@H]3[C@@H]2CC[C@]4([C@H]3CC[C@@H]4O)C)CC1=O)C
- InChI: InChI=1S/C20H32O2/c1-12-11-20(3)13(10-17(12)21)4-5-14-15-6-7-18(22)19(15,2)9-8-16(14)20/h12-16,18,22H,4-11H2,1-3H3/t12-,13+,14+,15+,16+,18+,19+,20+/m1/s1; Key:IKXILDNPCZPPRV-RFMGOVQKSA-N

Drostanolone, or dromostanolone, is an anabolic–androgenic steroid (AAS) of the dihydrotestosterone (DHT) group which was never marketed. An androgen ester prodrug of drostanolone, drostanolone propionate, was formerly used in the treatment of breast cancer in women under brand names such as Drolban, Masteril, and Masteron. This has also been used non-medically for physique- or performance-enhancing purposes.

== Pharmacology ==
=== Pharmacodynamics ===
Androgenic vs. anabolic activity ratio of androgens/anabolic steroids
Medication	Ratio^{a}
Testosterone	~1:1
Androstanolone (DHT)	~1:1
Methyltestosterone	~1:1
Methandriol	~1:1
Fluoxymesterone	1:1–1:15
Metandienone	1:1–1:8
Drostanolone	1:3–1:4
Metenolone	1:2–1:30
Oxymetholone	1:2–1:9
Oxandrolone	1:3–1:13
Stanozolol	1:1–1:30
Nandrolone	1:3–1:16
Ethylestrenol	1:2–1:19
Norethandrolone	1:1–1:20
Notes: In rodents. Footnotes: ^{a} = Ratio of androgenic to anabolic activity. Sources: See template.

Like other AAS, drostanolone is an agonist of the androgen receptor (AR). It is not a substrate for 5α-reductase and is a poor substrate for 3α-hydroxysteroid dehydrogenase (3α-HSD), and therefore shows a high ratio of anabolic to androgenic activity. As a DHT derivative, drostanolone is not a substrate for aromatase and hence cannot be aromatized into estrogenic metabolites. While no data are available on the progestogenic activity of drostanolone, it is thought to have low or no such activity similarly to other DHT derivatives. Since the drug is not 17α-alkylated, it is not known to cause hepatotoxicity.

== Chemistry ==
Drostanolone, also known as 2α-methyl-5α-dihydrotestosterone (2α-methyl-DHT) or as 2α-methyl-5α-androstan-17β-ol-3-one, is a synthetic androstane steroid and a derivative of DHT. It is specifically DHT with a methyl group at the C2α position.

== History ==
Drostanolone and its ester drostanolone propionate were first described in 1959. Drostanolone propionate was first introduced for medical use in 1961.

== Society and culture ==
=== Generic names ===
Drostanolone is the generic name of the drug and its INN, BAN, and DCF. It has also been referred to as dromostanolone.

=== Legal status ===
Drostanolone, along with other AAS, is a schedule III controlled substance in the United States under the Controlled Substances Act.

== Potential side effects ==
Like other AAS, drostanolone can cause a variety of side effects, including:

- Virilization: This refers to the development of masculine characteristics in women, such as deepening of the voice, increased body hair growth, and clitoral enlargement.
- Acne: AAS can increase sebum production, leading to acne.
- Hair loss: Drostanolone can accelerate male pattern baldness.
- Cardiovascular issues: AAS can negatively affect cholesterol levels and increase the risk of cardiovascular disease.
- Liver damage: Although drostanolone is not 17α-alkylated, high doses or prolonged use can still potentially damage the liver.
- Mood swings: AAS can cause aggression, irritability, and mood swings.

== Non-medical uses ==
Drostanolone is used by some bodybuilders and athletes to increase muscle mass and strength. It is often used during "cutting cycles" to help preserve muscle mass while losing body fat. However, the use of AAS for non-medical purposes is not recommended due to the potential for serious side effects.

== Synthesis ==
Bolazine is when react 2 eq. with hydrazine to give dimer

Thieme Synthesis:

Treatment of DHT (androstan-17β-ol-3-one, stanolone) [521-18-6] (1) with methyl formate and the strong base sodium methoxide gives [4033-95-8] (2). The newly added formyl function in the product is shown in the enol form. Catalytic hydrogenation reduces that function to a methyl group (3). The addition of hydrogen from the bottom face of the molecule leads to the formation of β-methyl isomer where the methyl group occupies the higher-energy axial position. Strong base-induced equilibration of the methyl group leads to the formation of the sterically favoured equatorial α-methyl isomer, affording dromostanolone (4).
