= 19-Noretiocholanolone =

Chemical compound

Clinical data
- Other names: Noretiocholanolone; 5β-Estran-3α-ol-17-one; 3α-Hydroxy-5β-estran-17-one

Identifiers
- IUPAC name: (3R,5R,8R,9R,10S,13S,14S)-3-Hydroxy-13-methyl-2,3,4,5,6,7,8,9,10,11,12,14,15,16-tetradecahydro-1H-cyclopenta[a]phenanthren-17-one
- CAS Number: 33036-33-8
- PubChem CID: 14009228
- ChemSpider: 19347817
- UNII: O5Z6602I6U
- CompTox Dashboard (EPA): DTXSID601043346

Chemical and physical data
- Formula: C_{18}H_{28}O_{2}
- Molar mass: 276.420 g·mol^{−1}
- 3D model (JSmol): Interactive image
- SMILES: C[C@]12CC[C@@H]3[C@H]4CC[C@H](C[C@H]4CC[C@H]3[C@@H]1CCC2=O)O
- InChI: InChI=1S/C18H28O2/c1-18-9-8-14-13-5-3-12(19)10-11(13)2-4-15(14)16(18)6-7-17(18)20/h11-16,19H,2-10H2,1H3/t11-,12-,13+,14-,15-,16+,18+/m1/s1; Key:UOUIARGWRPHDBX-DHMVHTBWSA-N

19-Noretiocholanolone, also known as 5β-estran-3α-ol-17-one, is a metabolite of nandrolone (19-nortestosterone) and bolandione (19-norandrostenedione) that is formed by 5α-reductase. It is on the list of substances prohibited by the World Anti-Doping Agency since it is a detectable metabolite of nandrolone, an anabolic-androgenic steroid (AAS).

Consumption of boar meat, liver, kidneys and heart have been found to increase urinary 19-noretiocholanolone output.

== See also ==
- Etiocholanolone
- 19-Norandrosterone
- 5α-Dihydronandrolone
- 5α-Dihydronorethisterone
