= 5α-Dihydronorethisterone =

Chemical compound

Clinical data
- Other names: 5α-DHNET; 5α-Dihydro-NET; Dihydronorethisterone; Dihydronorethindrone; DHNET; 17α-Ethynyl-5α-dihydro-19-nortestosterone; 17α-Ethynyl-5α-estran-17β-ol-3-one; STS-737; NSC-85401; 19-Nor-5α,17α-pregn-20-yn-17-ol-3-one

Identifiers
- IUPAC name: (5S,8R,9R,10S,13S,14S,17R)-17-ethynyl-17-hydroxy-13-methyl-1,2,4,5,6,7,8,9,10,11,12,14,15,16-tetradecahydrocyclopenta[a]phenanthren-3-one
- CAS Number: 52-79-9
- PubChem CID: 63023
- ChemSpider: 56721
- UNII: 2DD235DD5X
- ChEMBL: ChEMBL3273987
- CompTox Dashboard (EPA): DTXSID30966327

Chemical and physical data
- Formula: C_{20}H_{28}O_{2}
- Molar mass: 300.442 g·mol^{−1}
- 3D model (JSmol): Interactive image
- SMILES: C[C@]12CC[C@H]3[C@H]([C@@H]1CC[C@]2(C#C)O)CC[C@@H]4[C@@H]3CCC(=O)C4
- InChI: InChI=1S/C20H28O2/c1-3-20(22)11-9-18-17-6-4-13-12-14(21)5-7-15(13)16(17)8-10-19(18,20)2/h1,13,15-18,22H,4-12H2,2H3/t13-,15-,16+,17+,18-,19-,20-/m0/s1; Key:OMGILQMNIZWNOK-XDQPPUBWSA-N

5α-Dihydronorethisterone (5α-DHNET, dihydronorethisterone, 17α-ethynyl-5α-dihydro-19-nortestosterone, or 17α-ethynyl-5α-estran-17β-ol-3-one) is a major active metabolite of norethisterone (norethindrone). Norethisterone is a progestin with additional weak androgenic and estrogenic activity. 5α-DHNET is formed from norethisterone by 5α-reductase in the liver and other tissues.

== Pharmacology ==
Unlike norethisterone which is purely progestogenic, 5α-DHNET has been found to possess both progestogenic and marked antiprogestogenic activity, showing a profile of progestogenic activity like that of a selective progesterone receptor modulator (SPRM). Moreover, the affinity of 5α-DHNET for the progesterone receptor (PR) is greatly reduced relative to that of norethisterone at only 25% of that of progesterone (versus 150% for norethisterone).

5α-DHNET shows higher affinity for the androgen receptor (AR) compared to norethisterone with approximately 27% of the affinity of the potent androgen metribolone (versus 15% for norethisterone). However, although 5α-DHNET has higher affinity for the AR than does norethisterone, it has significantly diminished and in fact almost abolished androgenic activity in comparison to norethisterone in rodent bioassays. Similar findings were observed for ethisterone (17α-ethynyltestosterone) and its 5α-reduced metabolite, whereas 5α-reduction enhanced both the AR affinity and androgenic potency of testosterone and nandrolone (19-nortestosterone) in rodent bioassays. As such, it appears that the C17α ethynyl group of norethisterone is responsible for its loss of androgenicity upon 5α-reduction. Instead of androgenic activity, 5α-DHNET has been reported to possess some antiandrogenic activity.

Norethisterone and 5α-DHNET have been found to act as weak irreversible aromatase inhibitors (K_{i} = 1.7 μM and 9.0 μM, respectively). However, the concentrations required are probably too high to be clinically relevant at typical dosages of norethisterone. 5α-DHNET specifically has been assessed and found to be selective in its inhibition of aromatase, and does not affect other steroidogenesis enzymes such as cholesterol side-chain cleavage enzyme (P450scc), 17α-hydroxylase/17,20-lyase, 21-hydroxylase, or 11β-hydroxylase. Since it is not aromatized (and hence cannot be transformed into an estrogenic metabolite), unlike norethisterone, 5α-DHNET has been proposed as a potential therapeutic agent in the treatment of estrogen receptor (ER)-positive breast cancer.

Relative affinities (%) of norethisterone, metabolites, and prodrugs
Compound	Type^{a}	PR	AR	ER	GR	MR	SHBG	CBG
Norethisterone	–	67–75	15	0	0–1	0–3	16	0
5α-Dihydronorethisterone	Metabolite	25	27	0	0	?	?	?
3α,5α-Tetrahydronorethisterone	Metabolite	1	0	0–1	0	?	?	?
3α,5β-Tetrahydronorethisterone	Metabolite	?	0	0	?	?	?	?
3β,5α-Tetrahydronorethisterone	Metabolite	1	0	0–8	0	?	?	?
Ethinylestradiol	Metabolite	15–25	1–3	112	1–3	0	0.18	0
Norethisterone acetate	Prodrug	20	5	1	0	0	?	?
Norethisterone enanthate	Prodrug	?	?	?	?	?	?	?
Noretynodrel	Prodrug	6	0	2	0	0	0	0
Etynodiol	Prodrug	1	0	11–18	0	?	?	?
Etynodiol diacetate	Prodrug	1	0	0	0	0	?	?
Lynestrenol	Prodrug	1	1	3	0	0	?	?
Notes: Values are percentages (%). Reference ligands (100%) were promegestone for the PR, metribolone for the AR, estradiol for the ER, dexamethasone for the GR, aldosterone for the MR, dihydrotestosterone for SHBG, and cortisol for CBG. Footnotes: ^{a} = Active or inactive metabolite, prodrug, or neither of norethisterone. Sources: See template.

== See also ==
- 5α-Dihydroethisterone
- 5α-Dihydronandrolone
- 5α-Dihydronormethandrone
- 5α-Dihydrolevonorgestrel
