= Voice change =

Deepening of the voice of people as they reach puberty

A voice change or voice mutation, sometimes referred to as a voice break or voice crack, commonly refers to the deepening of the voice of men as they reach puberty. Before puberty both sexes have roughly similar vocal pitches, but during puberty the male voice typically deepens an octave, while the female voice gradually becomes richer.

A similar effect is a "voice crack", during which a person's voice suddenly and unintentionally enters a higher register (usually falsetto) for a brief period of time. This may be caused by singing or talking at a pitch outside the person's natural vocal range, stress, fatigue, emotional tension, or the physical changes associated with puberty. An instance of a voice crack (when associated with puberty) lasts for only a moment and generally occurs less frequently as the individual grows into maturity.

== Anatomical changes ==
Most of the voice change begins around puberty. Adult pitch is reached 2–3 years later, but the voice does not stabilize until the ages of 21–25. It usually happens months or years before the development of significant facial hair. Under the influence of sex hormones (namely testosterone), the voice box, or larynx, grows in both sexes. This growth is far more prominent in males than in females and is more easily perceived. It causes the voice to drop and deepen. Along with the larynx, the vocal folds (vocal cords) grow significantly longer and thicker.

The facial bones begin to grow as well. Cavities in the sinuses, the nose, and the back of the throat grow bigger, thus creating more space within the head to allow the voice to resonate. Occasionally, voice change is accompanied by unsteadiness of vocalization in the early stages of untrained voices. Due to the significant drop in pitch to the vocal range, people may unintentionally speak in head voice or even strain their voices using pitches which were previously chest voice, the lowest part of the modal voice register.

== History of voice cracks ==
Historical changes in the average age of puberty have had profound effects on the composing of music for children's voices. The composer Joseph Haydn was known for typically singing parts in high pitches throughout his 17th year.

Unchanged voices were in high demand for church choirs, which historically excluded women. The British cathedral choir ideal remains based on boy sopranos (or trebles), with the alto part executed by adult countertenors. In German-speaking countries, however, the alto parts are also sung by boys. Sometimes the voice lowers at stage 3 for females dropping to B_{3} or C_{4} for some the change in voice mostly happens at stage 4 including cracking and breaking for girls and same for boys. Historically, a strategy for avoiding the shift altogether was castration. Castrati are first documented in Italian church records from the 1550s. Mozart's Exultate Jubilate, Allegri's Miserere and parts of Handel's Messiah were written for this voice, whose distinctive timbre was widely exploited in Baroque opera. In 1861, the practice of castration became illegal in Italy, and in 1878 Pope Leo XIII prohibited the hiring of new castrati by the church. The last castrato was Alessandro Moreschi, who served in the Sistine Chapel Choir.

== Singing ==
Children are able to sing in the same octave as women. When the voices of male teenagers break, they are no longer able to sing in the same octave. For music sung in the same key as women, they can sing in falsetto or drop an octave.

== See also ==
- Puberty
- Voice masculinization and feminization
