= Androgen deficiency =

Lack of androgen hormones in the body

- Other names: Hypoandrogenism, androgen deficiency syndrome, men with hypogonadism, testosterone deficiency

Androgen deficiency is a medical condition characterized by insufficient androgenic activity in the body. Androgen deficiency most commonly affects women, in whose case the condition is called female androgen insufficiency syndrome (FAIS), although it can happen in both sexes. Androgenic activity is mediated by androgens (a class of steroid hormones with varying affinities for the androgen receptor), and is dependent on various factors including androgen receptor abundance, sensitivity and function. Androgen deficiency is associated with lack of energy and motivation, depression, low sexual desire, and in more severe cases changes in secondary sex characteristics.

== Signs and symptoms ==
Symptoms of the condition in males consist of loss of libido, impotence, infertility, shrinkage of the testicles, penis, and prostate, diminished masculinization (e.g., decreased facial and body hair growth), low muscle mass, anxiety, depression, fatigue, vasomotor symptoms (hot flashes), insomnia, headaches, cardiomyopathy and osteoporosis. In addition, symptoms of hyperestrogenism, such as gynecomastia and feminization, may be concurrently present in males.

In males, a type of myopathy can result from androgen deficiency known as testosterone deficiency myopathy or (hypogonadotropic) hypogonadism with myopathy. Signs and symptoms include elevated serum CK, symmetrical muscle wasting and muscle weakness (predominantly proximal), a burning sensation in the feet at night, waddling gait, and impaired fasting glucose. EMG showed low volitional contraction of short duration polyphasic units. Muscle biopsy showed evidence of myonecrosis and regeneration, some fibre splitting, chronic inflammatory cells (macrophages) infiltrating degenerating fibres, and an increase in adipose and fibrous tissue (fibrosis). A predominance of type I (slow-twitch/oxidative) muscle fibres, with some mixed atrophy of type II (fast-twitch/glycolytic) muscle fibres. Treatment is hormone replacement therapy of testosterone.

In females, hypoandrogenism consist of loss of libido, decreased body hair growth, depression, fatigue, vaginal vasocongestion (which can result in cramps), vasomotor symptoms (e.g., hot flashes and palpitations), insomnia, headaches, osteoporosis and reduced muscle mass. As estrogens are synthesized from androgens, symptoms of hypoestrogenism may be present in both sexes in cases of severe androgen deficiency.

== Causes ==
Hypoandrogenism is primarily caused by either dysfunction, failure, or absence of the gonads (hypergonadotropic) or impairment of the hypothalamus or pituitary gland (hypogonadotropic). This in turn can be caused by a multitude of different stimuli, including genetic conditions (e.g., GnRH/gonadotropin insensitivity and enzymatic defects of steroidogenesis), tumors, trauma, surgery, autoimmunity, radiation, infections, toxins, drugs, and many others. It may also be the result of conditions such as androgen insensitivity syndrome or hyperestrogenism. Old age may also be a factor in the development of hypoandrogenism, as androgen levels decline with age.

== Diagnosis ==
Diagnosis of androgenic deficiency in males is based on symptoms together with at least two measurements of testosterone done first thing in the morning after a period of not eating. In those without symptoms, testing is not generally recommended. Androgen deficiency is not usually checked for diagnosis in healthy women.

== Treatment ==
Treatment may consist of hormone replacement therapy with androgens in those with symptoms. Treatment mostly improves sexual function in males.

Gonadotropin-releasing hormone (GnRH)/GnRH agonists or gonadotropins may be given (in the case of hypogonadotropic hypoandrogenism). The Food and Drug Administration (FDA) stated in 2015 that neither the benefits nor the safety of testosterone have been established for low testosterone levels due to aging. The FDA has required that testosterone pharmaceutical labels include warning information about the possibility of an increased risk of heart attacks and stroke.

Androgen replacement therapy formulations and dosages used in men
| Route | Medication | Major brand names | Form | Dosage |
|---|---|---|---|---|
| Oral | Testosterone^{a} | – | Tablet | 400–800 mg/day (in divided doses) |
| Oral | Testosterone undecanoate | Andriol, Jatenzo, Kyzatrex | Capsule | 40–80 mg/2–4× day (with meals) |
| Oral | Methyltestosterone^{b} | Android, Metandren, Testred | Tablet | 10–50 mg/day |
| Oral | Fluoxymesterone^{b} | Halotestin, Ora-Testryl, Ultandren | Tablet | 5–20 mg/day |
| Oral | Metandienone^{b} | Dianabol | Tablet | 5–15 mg/day |
| Oral | Mesterolone^{b} | Proviron | Tablet | 25–150 mg/day |
| Sublingual | Testosterone^{b} | Testoral | Tablet | 5–10 mg 1–4×/day |
| Sublingual | Methyltestosterone^{b} | Metandren, Oreton Methyl | Tablet | 10–30 mg/day |
| Buccal | Testosterone | Striant | Tablet | 30 mg 2×/day |
| Buccal | Methyltestosterone^{b} | Metandren, Oreton Methyl | Tablet | 5–25 mg/day |
| Transdermal | Testosterone | AndroGel, Testim, TestoGel | Gel | 25–125 mg/day |
| Transdermal | Testosterone | Androderm, AndroPatch, TestoPatch | Non-scrotal patch | 2.5–15 mg/day |
| Transdermal | Testosterone | Testoderm | Scrotal patch | 4–6 mg/day |
| Transdermal | Testosterone | Axiron | Axillary solution | 30–120 mg/day |
| Transdermal | Androstanolone (DHT) | Andractim | Gel | 100–250 mg/day |
| Rectal | Testosterone | Rektandron, Testosteron^{b} | Suppository | 40 mg 2–3×/day |
| Injection (IM or SC) | Testosterone | Andronaq, Sterotate, Virosterone | Aqueous suspension | 10–50 mg 2–3×/week |
| Injection (IM or SC) | Testosterone propionate^{b} | Testoviron | Oil solution | 10–50 mg 2–3×/week |
| Injection (IM or SC) | Testosterone enanthate | Delatestryl | Oil solution | 50–250 mg 1x/1–4 weeks |
| Injection (IM or SC) | Testosterone enanthate | Xyosted | Auto-injector | 50–100 mg 1×/week |
| Injection (IM or SC) | Testosterone cypionate | Depo-Testosterone | Oil solution | 50–250 mg 1x/1–4 weeks |
| Injection (IM or SC) | Testosterone isobutyrate | Agovirin Depot | Aqueous suspension | 50–100 mg 1x/1–2 weeks |
| Injection (IM or SC) | Testosterone phenylacetate^{b} | Perandren, Androject | Oil solution | 50–200 mg 1×/3–5 weeks |
| Injection (IM or SC) | Mixed testosterone esters | Sustanon 100, Sustanon 250 | Oil solution | 50–250 mg 1×/2–4 weeks |
| Injection (IM or SC) | Testosterone undecanoate | Aveed, Nebido | Oil solution | 750–1,000 mg 1×/10–14 weeks |
| Injection (IM or SC) | Testosterone buciclate^{a} | – | Aqueous suspension | 600–1,000 mg 1×/12–20 weeks |
| Implant | Testosterone | Testopel | Pellet | 150–1,200 mg/3–6 months |
Notes: Men produce about 3 to 11 mg of testosterone per day (mean 7 mg/day in young men). Footnotes: ^{a} = Never marketed. ^{b} = No longer used and/or no longer marketed. Sources: See template.

== See also ==
- Androgen
- Hyperandrogenism
- Hyperestrogenism
- Hypergonadism
- Hypoestrogenism
- Hypogonadism
- Late-onset hypogonadism
- Hormone replacement therapy
- Feminizing hormone therapy
