= List of androgens/anabolic steroids available in the United States =

This is a complete list of androgens/anabolic steroids (AAS) and formulations that are approved by the FDA and available in the United States. AAS like testosterone are used in androgen replacement therapy (ART), a form of hormone replacement therapy (HRT), and for other indications.

== Testosterone and esters ==
Testosterone (unmodified/non-esterified) is available in the following formulations:

- Oral: Jatenzo, Andriol (as testosterone undecanoate, a prodrug of testosterone)
- Buccal tablets: Striant
- Intranasal gels: Natesto
- Transdermal:
  - Gels: Androgel, Fortesta, Testim, Testosterone (generic)
  - Solutions: Axiron, Testosterone (generic)
  - Patches: Androderm, Testoderm (discontinued), Testoderm TTS (discontinued), Testosterone (generic)
- Injectable oil solutions (as prodrugs of testosterone):
  - Testosterone cypionate (Depo-Testosterone, Testosterone Cypionate (generic))
  - Testosterone enanthate (Delatestryl, Testosterone Enanthate (generic))
  - Testosterone undecanoate (Aveed)
- Subcutaneous pellet implants: Testopel

Testosterone propionate (Testosterone Propionate (generic)), testosterone cypionate/estradiol cypionate (brand name Depo-Testadiol), testosterone enanthate/estradiol valerate (brand name Ditate-DS) as oil solutions for intramuscular injection were previously available but were discontinued.

Androstanolone (dihydrotestosterone; DHT) and esters are not available in the United States.

== Anabolic steroids ==
=== Oral, buccal, and/or sublingual ===
- Fluoxymesterone (Android-F, Halotestin, Ora-Testryl)
- Methyltestosterone (Android 5, Android 10, Android 25, Metandren, Oreton, Oreton Methyl, Testred, Virilon)
- Oxymetholone (Anadrol-50)
- Oxandrolone (Anavar)

(Note that while the above anabolic steroids remain available in at least one formulation, many of the above-listed brand names have been discontinued.)

Ethylestrenol (Maxibolin) and stanozolol (Winstrol) were previously available but were discontinued.

=== Intramuscular injection ===
Drostanolone propionate (Drolban, Masteron) nandrolone decanoate (Deca-Durabolin), and nandrolone phenylpropionate (Durabolin, NPP) were previously available but were discontinued.

== Miscellaneous ==
- Danazol (Danocrine)

Gestrinone and tibolone are also notable androgenic agents but have not been marketed in the United States.

== See also ==
- List of sex-hormonal medications available in the United States
- List of androgens/anabolic steroids
- List of androgen esters
