= Mesterolone =

Chemical compound

Clinical data
- Trade names: Proviron, others
- Other names: NSC-75054; SH-60723; SH-723; 1α-Methyl-4,5α-dihydrotestosterone; 1α-Methyl-DHT; 1α-Methyl-5α-androstan-17β-ol-3-one
- AHFS/Drugs.com: International Drug Names
- Routes of administration: By mouth
- Drug class: Androgen; Anabolic steroid
- ATC code: G03BB01 (WHO)

Legal status
- Legal status: AU: S4 (Prescription only); BR: Class C5 (Anabolic steroids); CA: Schedule IV; US: Schedule III

Pharmacokinetic data
- Bioavailability: 3%
- Protein binding: 98% (40% to Albumin, 58% to SHBG)
- Metabolism: Liver
- Elimination half-life: 12-13 hours
- Excretion: Urine

Identifiers
- IUPAC name: (1S,5S,8R,9S,10S,13S,14S,17S)-17-hydroxy-1,10,13-trimethyl-1,2,4,5,6,7,8,9,11,12,14,15,16,17-tetradecahydrocyclopenta[a]phenanthren-3-one
- CAS Number: 1424-00-6
- PubChem CID: 15020
- ChemSpider: 14296
- UNII: 0SRQ75X9I9
- KEGG: D04947
- ChEMBL: ChEMBL258918
- CompTox Dashboard (EPA): DTXSID90878533
- ECHA InfoCard: 100.014.397

Chemical and physical data
- Formula: C_{20}H_{32}O_{2}
- Molar mass: 304.474 g·mol^{−1}
- 3D model (JSmol): Interactive image
- SMILES: O=C4C[C@@H]3CC[C@@H]2[C@H](CC[C@]1(C)[C@@H](O)CC[C@H]12)[C@@]3(C)[C@@H](C)C4
- InChI: InChI=1S/C20H32O2/c1-12-10-14(21)11-13-4-5-15-16-6-7-18(22)19(16,2)9-8-17(15)20(12,13)3/h12-13,15-18,22H,4-11H2,1-3H3/t12-,13-,15-,16-,17-,18-,19-,20-/m0/s1; Key:UXYRZJKIQKRJCF-TZPFWLJSSA-N

Mesterolone, sold under the brand name Proviron among others, is an androgen and anabolic steroid (AAS) medication which is used mainly in the treatment of low testosterone levels. It has also been used to treat male infertility, although this use is controversial. It is taken by mouth.

Side effects of mesterolone include symptoms of masculinization like acne, scalp hair loss, increased body hair growth, voice changes, and increased sexual desire. It has no risk of liver damage. The drug is a synthetic androgen and anabolic steroid and hence is an agonist of the androgen receptor (AR), the biological target of androgens like testosterone and dihydrotestosterone (DHT). It has strong androgenic effects and weak anabolic effects, which make it useful for producing masculinization. The drug has no estrogenic effects.

Mesterolone was first described by 1966 and introduced for medical use by 1967. In addition to its medical use, mesterolone has been used to improve physique and performance, although it is not commonly used for such purposes due to its weak anabolic effects. The drug is a controlled substance in many countries and so non-medical use is generally illicit.

== Medical uses ==
Mesterolone is used in the treatment of androgen deficiency in male hypogonadism, anemia, and to support male fertility among other indications. It has also been used to treat delayed puberty in boys. Because it lacks estrogenic effects, mesterolone may be indicated for treating cases of androgen deficiency in which breast tenderness or gynecomastia is also present. The drug is described as a relatively weak androgen with partial activity and is rarely used for the purpose of androgen replacement therapy, but is still widely used in medicine.

Mesterolone is used in androgen replacement therapy at a dosage of 50 to 100 mg 2 to 3 times per day.

Androgen replacement therapy formulations and dosages used in men
Route	Medication	Major brand names	Form	Dosage
Oral	Testosterone^{a}	–	Tablet	400–800 mg/day (in divided doses)
Oral	Testosterone undecanoate	Andriol, Jatenzo, Kyzatrex	Capsule	40–80 mg/2–4× day (with meals)
Oral	Methyltestosterone^{b}	Android, Metandren, Testred	Tablet	10–50 mg/day
Oral	Fluoxymesterone^{b}	Halotestin, Ora-Testryl, Ultandren	Tablet	5–20 mg/day
Oral	Metandienone^{b}	Dianabol	Tablet	5–15 mg/day
Oral	Mesterolone^{b}	Proviron	Tablet	25–150 mg/day
Sublingual	Testosterone^{b}	Testoral	Tablet	5–10 mg 1–4×/day
Sublingual	Methyltestosterone^{b}	Metandren, Oreton Methyl	Tablet	10–30 mg/day
Buccal	Testosterone	Striant	Tablet	30 mg 2×/day
Buccal	Methyltestosterone^{b}	Metandren, Oreton Methyl	Tablet	5–25 mg/day
Transdermal	Testosterone	AndroGel, Testim, TestoGel	Gel	25–125 mg/day
Transdermal	Testosterone	Androderm, AndroPatch, TestoPatch	Non-scrotal patch	2.5–15 mg/day
Transdermal	Testosterone	Testoderm	Scrotal patch	4–6 mg/day
Transdermal	Testosterone	Axiron	Axillary solution	30–120 mg/day
Transdermal	Androstanolone (DHT)	Andractim	Gel	100–250 mg/day
Rectal	Testosterone	Rektandron, Testosteron^{b}	Suppository	40 mg 2–3×/day
Injection (IM or SC)	Testosterone	Andronaq, Sterotate, Virosterone	Aqueous suspension	10–50 mg 2–3×/week
Injection (IM or SC)	Testosterone propionate^{b}	Testoviron	Oil solution	10–50 mg 2–3×/week
Injection (IM or SC)	Testosterone enanthate	Delatestryl	Oil solution	50–250 mg 1x/1–4 weeks
Injection (IM or SC)	Testosterone enanthate	Xyosted	Auto-injector	50–100 mg 1×/week
Injection (IM or SC)	Testosterone cypionate	Depo-Testosterone	Oil solution	50–250 mg 1x/1–4 weeks
Injection (IM or SC)	Testosterone isobutyrate	Agovirin Depot	Aqueous suspension	50–100 mg 1x/1–2 weeks
Injection (IM or SC)	Testosterone phenylacetate^{b}	Perandren, Androject	Oil solution	50–200 mg 1×/3–5 weeks
Injection (IM or SC)	Mixed testosterone esters	Sustanon 100, Sustanon 250	Oil solution	50–250 mg 1×/2–4 weeks
Injection (IM or SC)	Testosterone undecanoate	Aveed, Nebido	Oil solution	750–1,000 mg 1×/10–14 weeks
Injection (IM or SC)	Testosterone buciclate^{a}	–	Aqueous suspension	600–1,000 mg 1×/12–20 weeks
Implant	Testosterone	Testopel	Pellet	150–1,200 mg/3–6 months
Notes: Men produce about 3 to 11 mg of testosterone per day (mean 7 mg/day in young men). Footnotes: ^{a} = Never marketed. ^{b} = No longer used and/or no longer marketed. Sources: See template.

== Non-medical uses ==
Mesterolone has been used for physique- and performance-enhancing purposes by competitive athletes, bodybuilders, and powerlifters.

== Side effects ==
Side effects of mesterolone include virilization among others.

== Pharmacology ==
=== Pharmacodynamics ===
Like other AAS, mesterolone is an agonist of the androgen receptor (AR). Mesterolone is described as a very poor anabolic agent due to inactivation by 3α-hydroxysteroid dehydrogenase (3α-HSD) in skeletal muscle tissue, similarly to DHT and mestanolone (17α-methyl-DHT). In contrast, testosterone is a very poor substrate for 3α-HSD, and so is not similarly inactivated in skeletal muscle. Because of its lack of potentiation by 5α-reductase in "androgenic" tissues and its inactivation by 3α-HSD in skeletal muscle, mesterolone is relatively low in both its androgenic potency and its anabolic potency. However, it does still show a greater ratio of anabolic activity to androgenic activity relative to testosterone.

Mesterolone is not a substrate for 5α-reductase, as it is already 5α-reduced, and hence is not potentiated in so-called "androgenic" tissues such as the skin, hair follicles, and prostate gland.

Mesterolone is not a substrate for aromatase, and so cannot be converted into an estrogen. As such, it has no propensity for producing estrogenic side effects such as gynecomastia and fluid retention. It also has no progestogenic activity.

Because mesterolone is not 17α-alkylated, it has little or no potential for hepatotoxicity. However, its risk of deleterious effects on the cardiovascular system is comparable to that of several other oral AAS.

=== Pharmacokinetics ===
The C1α methyl group of mesterolone inhibits its hepatic metabolism and thereby confers significant oral activity, although its oral bioavailability is still much lower than that of 17α-alkylated AAS. In any case, mesterolone is one of the few non-17α-alkylated AAS that is active with oral ingestion. Uniquely among AAS, mesterolone has very high affinity for human serum sex hormone-binding globulin (SHBG), about 440% that of DHT in one study and 82% of that of DHT in another study. As a result, it may displace endogenous testosterone from SHBG and thereby increase free testosterone concentrations, which may in part be involved in its effects.

== Chemistry ==
Mesterolone, also known as 1α-methyl-4,5α-dihydrotestosterone (1α-methyl-DHT) or as 1α-methyl-5α-androstan-17β-ol-3-one, is a synthetic androstane steroid and derivative of DHT. It is specifically DHT with a methyl group at the C1α position. Closely related AAS include metenolone and its esters metenolone acetate and metenolone enanthate. The antiandrogen rosterolone (17α-propylmesterolone) is also closely related to mesterolone.

The 17alpha-methylated analog of Mesterolone is called Demalon [2881-21-2]. The structure of mesterolone is also similar to delanterone.

== History ==
Mesterolone was developed in the 1960s and was first described by 1966. It was introduced for medical use by Schering under the brand name Proviron by 1967. The well-established brand name Proviron had previously been used by Schering for testosterone propionate starting in 1936. Following the introduction of mesterolone as Proviron, Schering continued to market testosterone propionate under the brand name Testoviron. A number of sources incorrectly state that mesterolone was synthesized or introduced for medical use in 1934.

== Society and culture ==
=== Generic names ===
Mesterolone is the generic name of the drug and its INN, USAN, BAN, and DCIT, while mestérolone is its DCF.

=== Brand names ===
Mesterolone is marketed mainly under the brand name Proviron.

=== Availability ===
Mesterolone is available widely throughout the world, including in the United Kingdom, Australia, and South Africa, as well as many non-English-speaking countries. It is not available in the United States, Canada, or New Zealand. The drug has never been marketed in the United States.

=== Legal status ===
Mesterolone, along with other AAS, is a schedule III controlled substance in the United States under the Controlled Substances Act and a schedule IV controlled substance in Canada under the Controlled Drugs and Substances Act.

== Research ==
In one small scale clinical trial of depressed patients, an improvement of symptoms which included anxiety, lack of drive and desire was observed. In patients with dysthymia, unipolar, and bipolar depression significant improvement was observed. In this series of studies, mesterolone lead to a significant decrease in luteinizing hormone and testosterone levels.(in doses higher than 50mg). In another study, 100 mg mesterolone cipionate was administered twice monthly. With regards to plasma testosterone levels, there was no difference between the treated versus untreated group, and baseline luteinizing hormone levels were minimally affected.
