= Estradiol valerate/testosterone enanthate =

Combination drug

Estradiol valerate / testosterone enanthate

- Estradiol valerate (top) and testosterone enanthate (bottom)

Combination of
- Estradiol valerate: Estrogen
- Testosterone enanthate: Androgen; Anabolic steroid

Clinical data
- Trade names: Deladumone, Despamen, Ditate, Ditate-DS, Gravignost, Primodian Depot, Valertest, others
- Other names: EV/TE; TEEV
- Routes of administration: Intramuscular injection

Identifiers
- CAS Number: 979-32-8; 315-37-7
- PubChem CID: 69248505
- UNII: OKG364O896; 7Z6522T8N9

Estradiol valerate/testosterone enanthate (EV/TE), sold under the brand names Primodian Depot and Ditate among others, is an injectable combination medication of estradiol valerate (EV), an estrogen, and testosterone enanthate (TE), an androgen/anabolic steroid, which is used in menopausal hormone therapy for women. The medication is also used to suppress lactation in postpartum women (brand name Deladumone).

Ditate was provided in the form of multi-use 10 mL vials containing 4 mg/mL EV and 90 mg/mL TE in an oil solution and was administered by intramuscular injection at regular intervals. Conversely, another preparation, Ditate-DS, was provided in the form of single-use 2 mL vials containing 8 mg/mL EV and 180 mg/mL TE in an oil solution, and was administered as a single intramuscular injection. Another product, Primodian Depot, was provided in the form of 1 mL ampoules containing 4 mg/mL EV (3.0 mg/mL free estradiol) and 90.3 mg/mL TE (65 mg/mL free testosterone) in an oil solution, and was administered by intramuscular injection once every 4 to 6 weeks. The elimination half-life of EV in oil by intramuscular injection is approximately 4 or 5 days. Similarly, the elimination half-life of TE in oil by intramuscular injection is approximately 4 or 5 days. EV/TE reportedly has a duration of about 21 days.

Deladumone OB was a double-dosage formulation of Deladumone, which was intended to provide the same dosage with a smaller injection volume.

Primodian Depot was introduced for medical use by 1955. An oral tablet product with the similar brand name of Primodian, containing ethinylestradiol and methyltestosterone, was marketed around the same time, and should not be confused with the injectable Primodian Depot. EV/TE was discontinued in the United States by 2011. EV/TE has been discontinued in most other countries as well, but formulations of EV/TE continue to be marketed in a few countries, including Japan, Mexico, Peru, and Taiwan.

Androgen replacement therapy formulations and dosages used in women
Route	Medication	Major brand names	Form	Dosage
Oral	Testosterone undecanoate	Andriol, Jatenzo	Capsule	40–80 mg 1x/1–2 days
Oral	Methyltestosterone	Metandren, Estratest	Tablet	0.5–10 mg/day
Oral	Fluoxymesterone	Halotestin	Tablet	1–2.5 mg 1x/1–2 days
Oral	Normethandrone^{a}	Ginecoside	Tablet	5 mg/day
Oral	Tibolone	Livial	Tablet	1.25–2.5 mg/day
Oral	Prasterone (DHEA)^{b}	–	Tablet	10–100 mg/day
Sublingual	Methyltestosterone	Metandren	Tablet	0.25 mg/day
Transdermal	Testosterone	Intrinsa	Patch	150–300 μg/day
Transdermal	Testosterone	AndroGel	Gel, cream	1–10 mg/day
Vaginal	Prasterone (DHEA)	Intrarosa	Insert	6.5 mg/day
Injection	Testosterone propionate^{a}	Testoviron	Oil solution	25 mg 1x/1–2 weeks
Injection	Testosterone enanthate	Delatestryl, Primodian Depot	Oil solution	25–100 mg 1x/4–6 weeks
Injection	Testosterone cypionate	Depo-Testosterone, Depo-Testadiol	Oil solution	25–100 mg 1x/4–6 weeks
Injection	Testosterone isobutyrate^{a}	Femandren M, Folivirin	Aqueous suspension	25–50 mg 1x/4–6 weeks
Injection	Mixed testosterone esters	Climacteron^{a}	Oil solution	150 mg 1x/4–8 weeks
Injection	Mixed testosterone esters	Omnadren, Sustanon	Oil solution	50–100 mg 1x/4–6 weeks
Injection	Nandrolone decanoate	Deca-Durabolin	Oil solution	25–50 mg 1x/6–12 weeks
Injection	Prasterone enanthate^{a}	Gynodian Depot	Oil solution	200 mg 1x/4–6 weeks
Implant	Testosterone	Testopel	Pellet	50–100 mg 1x/3–6 months
Notes: Premenopausal women produce about 230 ± 70 μg testosterone per day (6.4 ± 2.0 mg testosterone per 4 weeks), with a range of 130 to 330 μg per day (3.6–9.2 mg per 4 weeks). Footnotes: ^{a} = Mostly discontinued or unavailable. ^{b} = Over-the-counter. Sources: See template.

== See also ==
- List of combined sex-hormonal preparations
