= Androgen replacement therapy =

Form of hormone therapy

- Other names: Androgen replacement therapy

Testosterone replacement therapy (TRT), also known as androgen replacement therapy (ART), is a form of hormone therapy in which androgens, most often testosterone, are supplemented or replaced. It typically involves the administration of testosterone through injections, skin creams, patches, gels, pills, or subcutaneous pellets. ART is often prescribed to counter the effects of male hypogonadism.

ART is also prescribed to lessen the effects or delay the onset of normal male aging. However, this is controversial and is the subject of ongoing clinical trials.

As men enter middle age they may notice changes caused by a relative decline in testosterone: fewer erections, fatigue, thinning skin, declining muscle mass and strength, and/or more body fat. Dissatisfaction with these changes causes some middle age men to seek ART. Androgen deficiencies in women have also, as of 2001, been recognized as a medical disorder that can be treated with ART. As with men, symptoms associated with androgen deficiency are most prevalent with age, and androgen replacement therapy has been shown to help with symptoms of menopause.

Testosterone has many effects on the body, either when made by the body or when given as a hormone replacement. Testosterone has anabolic effects on muscle and bone, leading to increased muscle mass and bone density. It is also known to stimulate erythropoesis (red blood cell production). It is known to improve penile blood flow to help with erections and also improve sexual drive or desire.

== Medical uses ==
=== Males ===
Androgen replacement is the classic treatment of hypogonadism. It is also used in men who have lost the ability to produce androgens due to disease or its treatment. Testosterone replacement in men with hypogonadism has consistently shown to improve sexual function; including increases in libido and sexual activity. Testosterone treatment in men with hypogonadism was shown to have modest improvements in physical activity, modest improvements in mood (but it did not improve mood in those with major depression), and some studies showed modest improvements in subjective energy levels and self reported physical fitness. Testosterone therapy was not shown to improve cognitive function in men with hypogonadism. Testosterone therapy was also shown to raise the hemoglobin (blood count) by 1 point in 33-50% of people, and increase bone density by up to 7% in the spine and hip, but the clinical significance of these changes is unclear.

==== Erectile function ====
Erectile function was shown to modestly improve in some studies of testosterone treatment for male hypogonadism, other studies did not show a benefit. A 2024 systematic review and meta-analysis of 28 randomized controlled trials found that testosterone therapy modestly improved objective erection scores, although only 12 of the included trials contributed data to the erectile-function analysis.

A 2024 Cochrane systematic review found that testosterone replacement therapy probably results in little to no clinically meaningful improvement in erectile function compared with placebo over the short term. The authors also found insufficient evidence to establish the longer-term effects of treatment on erectile function.

Androgen replacement therapy formulations and dosages used in men
Route	Medication	Major brand names	Form	Dosage
Oral	Testosterone^{a}	–	Tablet	400–800 mg/day (in divided doses)
Oral	Testosterone undecanoate	Andriol, Jatenzo, Kyzatrex	Capsule	40–80 mg/2–4× day (with meals)
Oral	Methyltestosterone^{b}	Android, Metandren, Testred	Tablet	10–50 mg/day
Oral	Fluoxymesterone^{b}	Halotestin, Ora-Testryl, Ultandren	Tablet	5–20 mg/day
Oral	Metandienone^{b}	Dianabol	Tablet	5–15 mg/day
Oral	Mesterolone^{b}	Proviron	Tablet	25–150 mg/day
Sublingual	Testosterone^{b}	Testoral	Tablet	5–10 mg 1–4×/day
Sublingual	Methyltestosterone^{b}	Metandren, Oreton Methyl	Tablet	10–30 mg/day
Buccal	Testosterone	Striant	Tablet	30 mg 2×/day
Buccal	Methyltestosterone^{b}	Metandren, Oreton Methyl	Tablet	5–25 mg/day
Transdermal	Testosterone	AndroGel, Testim, TestoGel	Gel	25–125 mg/day
Transdermal	Testosterone	Androderm, AndroPatch, TestoPatch	Non-scrotal patch	2.5–15 mg/day
Transdermal	Testosterone	Testoderm	Scrotal patch	4–6 mg/day
Transdermal	Testosterone	Axiron	Axillary solution	30–120 mg/day
Transdermal	Androstanolone (DHT)	Andractim	Gel	100–250 mg/day
Rectal	Testosterone	Rektandron, Testosteron^{b}	Suppository	40 mg 2–3×/day
Injection (IM or SC)	Testosterone	Andronaq, Sterotate, Virosterone	Aqueous suspension	10–50 mg 2–3×/week
Injection (IM or SC)	Testosterone propionate^{b}	Testoviron	Oil solution	10–50 mg 2–3×/week
Injection (IM or SC)	Testosterone enanthate	Delatestryl	Oil solution	50–250 mg 1x/1–4 weeks
Injection (IM or SC)	Testosterone enanthate	Xyosted	Auto-injector	50–100 mg 1×/week
Injection (IM or SC)	Testosterone cypionate	Depo-Testosterone	Oil solution	50–250 mg 1x/1–4 weeks
Injection (IM or SC)	Testosterone isobutyrate	Agovirin Depot	Aqueous suspension	50–100 mg 1x/1–2 weeks
Injection (IM or SC)	Testosterone phenylacetate^{b}	Perandren, Androject	Oil solution	50–200 mg 1×/3–5 weeks
Injection (IM or SC)	Mixed testosterone esters	Sustanon 100, Sustanon 250	Oil solution	50–250 mg 1×/2–4 weeks
Injection (IM or SC)	Testosterone undecanoate	Aveed, Nebido	Oil solution	750–1,000 mg 1×/10–14 weeks
Injection (IM or SC)	Testosterone buciclate^{a}	–	Aqueous suspension	600–1,000 mg 1×/12–20 weeks
Implant	Testosterone	Testopel	Pellet	150–1,200 mg/3–6 months
Notes: Men produce about 3 to 11 mg of testosterone per day (mean 7 mg/day in young men). Footnotes: ^{a} = Never marketed. ^{b} = No longer used and/or no longer marketed. Sources: See template.

==== Diabetes ====
The risks of diabetes and of testosterone deficiency in men over 45 (i.e., hypogonadism, specifically hypoandrogenism) are strongly correlated. Testosterone replacement therapies have been shown to improve blood glucose management. Still, "it is prudent not to start testosterone therapy in men with diabetes solely for the purpose of improving metabolic control if they show no signs and symptoms of hypogonadism."

Other studies have not shown a benefit in diabetes prevention or better diabetes control with testosterone therapy. One study showed testosterone therapy in older men with low testosterone not changing sugar levels or hemoglobin A1c (used as a marker of diabetes control, or for the diagnosis of diabetes) compared to placebo. In another trial from 2024, testosterone therapy for men with hypogonadism and prediabetes did not prevent the progression of prediabetes to diabetes and it did not improve diabetes control compared to placebo.

=== Females ===
Androgen replacement is used in postmenopausal women: the indications are to increase sexual desire; and to prevent or treat osteoporosis. Other symptoms of androgen deficiency are similar in both sexes, such as muscle loss and physical fatigue. The androgens used for androgen replacement in women include testosterone (and esters), prasterone (dehydroepiandrosterone; DHEA) (and the ester prasterone enanthate), methyltestosterone, nandrolone decanoate, and tibolone, among others.

Androgen replacement therapy formulations and dosages used in women
Route	Medication	Major brand names	Form	Dosage
Oral	Testosterone undecanoate	Andriol, Jatenzo	Capsule	40–80 mg 1x/1–2 days
Oral	Methyltestosterone	Metandren, Estratest	Tablet	0.5–10 mg/day
Oral	Fluoxymesterone	Halotestin	Tablet	1–2.5 mg 1x/1–2 days
Oral	Normethandrone^{a}	Ginecoside	Tablet	5 mg/day
Oral	Tibolone	Livial	Tablet	1.25–2.5 mg/day
Oral	Prasterone (DHEA)^{b}	–	Tablet	10–100 mg/day
Sublingual	Methyltestosterone	Metandren	Tablet	0.25 mg/day
Transdermal	Testosterone	Intrinsa	Patch	150–300 μg/day
Transdermal	Testosterone	AndroGel	Gel, cream	1–10 mg/day
Vaginal	Prasterone (DHEA)	Intrarosa	Insert	6.5 mg/day
Injection	Testosterone propionate^{a}	Testoviron	Oil solution	25 mg 1x/1–2 weeks
Injection	Testosterone enanthate	Delatestryl, Primodian Depot	Oil solution	25–100 mg 1x/4–6 weeks
Injection	Testosterone cypionate	Depo-Testosterone, Depo-Testadiol	Oil solution	25–100 mg 1x/4–6 weeks
Injection	Testosterone isobutyrate^{a}	Femandren M, Folivirin	Aqueous suspension	25–50 mg 1x/4–6 weeks
Injection	Mixed testosterone esters	Climacteron^{a}	Oil solution	150 mg 1x/4–8 weeks
Injection	Mixed testosterone esters	Omnadren, Sustanon	Oil solution	50–100 mg 1x/4–6 weeks
Injection	Nandrolone decanoate	Deca-Durabolin	Oil solution	25–50 mg 1x/6–12 weeks
Injection	Prasterone enanthate^{a}	Gynodian Depot	Oil solution	200 mg 1x/4–6 weeks
Implant	Testosterone	Testopel	Pellet	50–100 mg 1x/3–6 months
Notes: Premenopausal women produce about 230 ± 70 μg testosterone per day (6.4 ± 2.0 mg testosterone per 4 weeks), with a range of 130 to 330 μg per day (3.6–9.2 mg per 4 weeks). Footnotes: ^{a} = Mostly discontinued or unavailable. ^{b} = Over-the-counter. Sources: See template.

== Adverse effects ==
The Food and Drug Administration (FDA) stated in 2015 that neither the benefits nor the safety of testosterone have been established for low testosterone levels due to aging. The FDA has required that testosterone labels include warning information about the possibility of an increased risk of heart attacks and stroke.

In February 2025, the FDA removed the black box warning on prescription testosterone products regarding increased risk of adverse cardiovascular outcomes, following the results of the TRAVERSE trial which demonstrated no increased risk compared to placebo in men with hypogonadism. The FDA now requires labeling to include TRAVERSE trial data, and continues to monitor other potential risks such as increased blood pressure.

=== Heart disease ===
On January 31, 2014, reports of strokes, heart attacks, and deaths in men taking testosterone-replacement led the FDA to announce that it would be investigating this issue. The FDA's action followed three peer-reviewed studies of increased cardiovascular events and deaths. Due to an increased rate of adverse cardiovascular events compared to a placebo group, a randomized trial stopped early. Also, in November 2013, a study reported an increase in deaths and heart attacks in older men. Concerns have been raised that testosterone was being widely marketed without the benefit of data on efficacy and safety from large randomized controlled trials. As a result of the "potential for adverse cardiovascular outcomes", the FDA announced, in September 2014, a review of the appropriateness and safety of testosterone replacement therapy. However, when given to men with hypogonadism in the short- and medium-term (over a median of 33 months in the TRAVERSE trial), testosterone replacement therapy does not increase the risk of cardiovascular events (including strokes and heart attacks). The long-term safety of the therapy is not known yet.

=== Other ===
Other significant adverse effects of testosterone supplementation include acceleration of pre-existing prostate cancer growth in individuals who have undergone androgen deprivation; increased hematocrit, which can require venipuncture in order to treat; and, exacerbation of sleep apnea. A 2014 review said there was some evidence men with certain comorbidities may be at risk of adverse effects including sleep apnoea, metabolic syndrome and cardiovascular disease. Exogenous testosterone may also cause suppression of spermatogenesis, leading to, in some cases, infertility. It is recommended that physicians screen for prostate cancer with a digital rectal exam and prostate-specific antigen (PSA) level before starting therapy, and monitor PSA and hematocrit levels closely during therapy.

Some studies suggest that ART increases the risk of prostate cancer, although the results are not conclusive. This may be due to many men with risk factors for prostate cancer being excluded from testosterone replacement studies. The PSA (which is a screening blood test for prostate cancer) usually increases with testosterone therapy which may lead to a higher rate of prostate cancer testing, including imaging or biopsies. Although testosterone is theoretically hypothesized to increase prostate size, the effects of testosterone therapy on enlarged prostate or lower urinary tract symptoms (such as urinary urgency, hesitancy or incomplete emptying) is not known.

Testosterone therapy may increase the risk of blood clots, but those with blood clots in the trials were not tested for blood clotting disorders, possibly confounding the findings. Testosterone therapy was found to increase the risk of an irregular heartbeat due to atrial fibrillation in one study (3.5% vs 2.4%), but other studies (including meta analyses) have not found an increased risk.

== Methods of administration ==
There are several artificial androgens, many of which are manipulations of the testosterone molecule referred to as anabolic-androgenic steroids. Androgen replacement is administered by patch, tablet, capsule, cream or gel; or depot injections given into fat or muscle.

== Society and culture ==
=== MMA ===
Some UFC fighters used TRT until 2014 when the Nevada State Athletic Commission banned its use.

=== Regulation ===
As of September 2014, testosterone replacement therapy has been under review for appropriateness and safety by the Food and Drug Administration due to the "potential for adverse cardiovascular outcomes".

=== Frequency of use ===
In the United States usage increased from 0.5% in 2002 to 3.2% in 2013 and have since decreased to 1.7% in 2016.

A UK study in 2013 showed that prescriptions for testosterone replacement, particularly transdermal products, almost doubled between 2000 and 2010.

== Research ==
Testosterone is being investigated as therapy for the following conditions:

- Erectile dysfunction
- Osteoporosis
- Diabetes mellitus
- Chronic heart failure
- Dementia, but the evidence base is small and the balance of benefit needs to be clarified

== See also ==
- List of androgens/anabolic steroids available in the United States
- Androgen deficiency
- Masculinizing hormone therapy
- Hormone replacement therapy
- Feminizing hormone therapy
