= Late-onset hypogonadism =

- Specialty: Endocrinology

Late-onset hypogonadism (LOH) or testosterone deficiency syndrome (TDS) is a condition in older men characterized by measurably low testosterone levels and clinical symptoms mostly of a sexual nature, including decreased libido, fewer spontaneous erections, and erectile dysfunction. It is the result of a gradual drop in testosterone; a steady decline in testosterone levels of about 1% per year can happen and is well documented in both men and women.

== Signs and symptoms ==
Some men present with symptoms, but they have normal testosterone levels, while others with low testosterone levels have no symptoms. The reasons for this phenomenon are currently unknown.

In their late 40s and early 50s, some men may experience depression, loss of libido, erectile dysfunction, and other physical and emotional symptoms. These symptoms include irritability, loss of muscle mass and reduced ability to exercise, weight gain, lack of energy, difficulty sleeping, and poor concentration. Many of these symptoms may arise from a midlife crisis or as the results of a long-term unhealthy lifestyle (smoking, excess drinking, overeating, lack of exercise) and may be best addressed by lifestyle changes, therapy, or antidepressants.

== Causes ==
Testosterone levels are well-documented to decline with aging at about 1% per year in both men and women after a certain age; the causes are not well understood.

Men aged 40–70 years, total serum testosterone decreases at a rate of 0.4% per year, while free testosterone shows a greater decline of 1.3% annually. In males over 35 years old, there are alterations in the hypothalamic–pituitary–gonadal axis, particularly a decrease in gonadotropin-releasing hormone secretion and reduced leydig cell responsiveness to luteinizing hormone stimulation partly due to mitochondrial dysfuction and SASP from senescent cells.

== Diagnosis ==
As of 2016, the International Society for the Study of the Aging Male defines late-onset hypogonadism as a series of symptoms in older adults related to testosterone deficiency that combines features of both primary and secondary hypogonadism; the European Male Aging Study (a prospective study of ~3000 men) defined the condition by the presence of at least three sexual symptoms (e.g. reduced libido, reduced spontaneous erections, and erectile dysfunction) and total testosterone concentrations less than 11 nmol/L (3.2 ng/mL) and free testosterone concentrations less than 220 pmol/L (64 pg/mL).

If a person has symptoms of late-onset hypogonadism, testosterone is measured by taking blood in the morning on at least two days; while immunoassays are commonly used, mass spectrometry is more accurate and is becoming more widely available. The meaning of the measurement is different depending on many factors that affect how testosterone is made and how it is carried in the blood. Increased concentrations of proteins that bind testosterone in blood occur if the person is older, has hyperthyroidism or liver disease, or is taking anticonvulsant drugs (which are increasingly used for depression and various neuropathies), and decreased concentrations of proteins that bind testosterone occur if the person is obese, has diabetes, has hypothyroidism, has liver disease, or is taking glucocorticoids or androgens, or progestins. If levels are low, conditions that cause primary and secondary hypogonadism need to be ruled out.

== Screening ==
Due to difficulty and expense of testing, and the ambiguity of the results, screening is not recommended. While some clinical instruments (standard surveys) had been developed as of 2016, their specificity was too low to be useful clinically.

== Management ==
The significance of a decrease in testosterone levels is debated and its treatment with replacement is controversial. The Food and Drug Administration (FDA) stated in 2015 that neither the benefits nor the safety of testosterone have been established in older men with low testosterone levels. Testosterone replacement therapy should only be started if low levels have been confirmed; in the US, this confirmation is not done about 25% of the time, as of 2015. Testosterone levels should also be monitored during therapy.

Androgen replacement therapy formulations and dosages used in men
Route	Medication	Major brand names	Form	Dosage
Oral	Testosterone^{a}	–	Tablet	400–800 mg/day (in divided doses)
Oral	Testosterone undecanoate	Andriol, Jatenzo, Kyzatrex	Capsule	40–80 mg/2–4× day (with meals)
Oral	Methyltestosterone^{b}	Android, Metandren, Testred	Tablet	10–50 mg/day
Oral	Fluoxymesterone^{b}	Halotestin, Ora-Testryl, Ultandren	Tablet	5–20 mg/day
Oral	Metandienone^{b}	Dianabol	Tablet	5–15 mg/day
Oral	Mesterolone^{b}	Proviron	Tablet	25–150 mg/day
Sublingual	Testosterone^{b}	Testoral	Tablet	5–10 mg 1–4×/day
Sublingual	Methyltestosterone^{b}	Metandren, Oreton Methyl	Tablet	10–30 mg/day
Buccal	Testosterone	Striant	Tablet	30 mg 2×/day
Buccal	Methyltestosterone^{b}	Metandren, Oreton Methyl	Tablet	5–25 mg/day
Transdermal	Testosterone	AndroGel, Testim, TestoGel	Gel	25–125 mg/day
Transdermal	Testosterone	Androderm, AndroPatch, TestoPatch	Non-scrotal patch	2.5–15 mg/day
Transdermal	Testosterone	Testoderm	Scrotal patch	4–6 mg/day
Transdermal	Testosterone	Axiron	Axillary solution	30–120 mg/day
Transdermal	Androstanolone (DHT)	Andractim	Gel	100–250 mg/day
Rectal	Testosterone	Rektandron, Testosteron^{b}	Suppository	40 mg 2–3×/day
Injection (IM or SC)	Testosterone	Andronaq, Sterotate, Virosterone	Aqueous suspension	10–50 mg 2–3×/week
Injection (IM or SC)	Testosterone propionate^{b}	Testoviron	Oil solution	10–50 mg 2–3×/week
Injection (IM or SC)	Testosterone enanthate	Delatestryl	Oil solution	50–250 mg 1x/1–4 weeks
Injection (IM or SC)	Testosterone enanthate	Xyosted	Auto-injector	50–100 mg 1×/week
Injection (IM or SC)	Testosterone cypionate	Depo-Testosterone	Oil solution	50–250 mg 1x/1–4 weeks
Injection (IM or SC)	Testosterone isobutyrate	Agovirin Depot	Aqueous suspension	50–100 mg 1x/1–2 weeks
Injection (IM or SC)	Testosterone phenylacetate^{b}	Perandren, Androject	Oil solution	50–200 mg 1×/3–5 weeks
Injection (IM or SC)	Mixed testosterone esters	Sustanon 100, Sustanon 250	Oil solution	50–250 mg 1×/2–4 weeks
Injection (IM or SC)	Testosterone undecanoate	Aveed, Nebido	Oil solution	750–1,000 mg 1×/10–14 weeks
Injection (IM or SC)	Testosterone buciclate^{a}	–	Aqueous suspension	600–1,000 mg 1×/12–20 weeks
Implant	Testosterone	Testopel	Pellet	150–1,200 mg/3–6 months
Notes: Men produce about 3 to 11 mg of testosterone per day (mean 7 mg/day in young men). Footnotes: ^{a} = Never marketed. ^{b} = No longer used and/or no longer marketed. Sources: See template.

=== Adverse effects ===
Adverse effects of testosterone supplementation may include increased cardiovascular (CV) events (including strokes and heart attacks) and deaths, especially in men over 65 and men with pre-existing heart conditions. The potential for CV risks from testosterone therapy led the FDA to issue a requirement in 2015 that testosterone pharmaceutical labels include warning information about the possibility of an increased risk of heart attacks and stroke. However, the data are mixed, so the European Medicines Agency, the American Association of Clinical Endocrinologists, and the American College of Endocrinology have stated that no consistent evidence shows that testosterone therapy either increases or decreases cardiovascular risk.

Other significant adverse effects of testosterone supplementation include acceleration of pre-existing prostate cancer growth; increased hematocrit, which can require venipuncture to treat; and, exacerbation of sleep apnea.

Adverse effects may also include minor side effects such as acne and oily skin, as well as significant hair loss and/or thinning of the hair, which may be prevented with 5-alpha reductase inhibitors ordinarily used for the treatment of benign prostatic hyperplasia, such as finasteride or dutasteride.

Exogenous testosterone may also cause suppression of spermatogenesis, leading to, in some cases, infertility.

== Prognosis ==
As of 2015, the evidence is inconclusive as to whether testosterone replacement therapy can help with erectile dysfunction in men with late-onset hypogonadism. It appears that testosterone replacement therapy may benefit men with symptoms of frailty who have late-onset hypogonadism.

== Epidemiology ==
The epidemiology is not clear; 20% of men in their 60s and 30% of men in their 70s have low testosterone; around 5% of men between 70 and 79 have both low testosterone and the symptoms, so are diagnosed with late-onset hypogonadism. The UK National Health Service describes it as rare.

== Pathophysiology ==
Testosterone synthesis involves the hypothalamic-pituitary-gonadal (HPG) axis. As aging occurs both gonadal and hypothalamic-pituitary functions decline. This reduced secretion of testosterone can be caused by old age which usually results in primary hypogonadism. The dysfunction of this system is due to degradation of Leydig cells which causes testosterone levels to drop. There have been a number of cellular changes identified that affect the production of testosterone as age increases. Some of these include luteinizing hormone and cAMP production. Though it is seen that when secondary hypogonadism occurs it can be linked to obesity and other risk factors rather than old age. When it comes to testosterone deficiency in men who have obesity the issue begins at the gonadotrophin releasing hormone neurons. As a result the hypogonadism that was originally caused by obesity can result in obesity symptoms worsening.

== History ==
The impact of low levels of testosterone has been previously reported. In 1944, Heller and Myers identified symptoms of what they labeled the "male climacteric" including loss of libido and potency, nervousness, depression, impaired memory, the inability to concentrate, fatigue, insomnia, hot flushes, and sweating. Heller and Myers found that their subjects had lower than normal levels of testosterone, and that symptoms decreased dramatically when patients were given replacement doses of testosterone.

== Society and culture ==
The 1997 book Male Menopause by Jed Diamond, a psychologist with a PhD in international health, fueled popular interest in the concept of "andropause". Diamond regards andropause as a change of life in middle-aged men which has hormonal, physical, psychological, interpersonal, social, sexual, and spiritual aspects. Diamond claims that this change occurs in all men, that it may occur as early as age 45 to 50 and more dramatically after the age of 70 in some men, and that women's and men's experiences are somewhat similar phenomena. The medical community has rejected the term "andropause" and its supposed parallels with menopause.

Thomas Perls and David J. Handelsman, in a 2015 editorial in the Journal of the American Geriatrics Society, say that between the ill-defined nature of the diagnosis and the pressure and advertising from drug companies selling testosterone and human-growth hormone, as well as dietary supplement companies selling all kinds of "boosters" for aging men, the condition is overdiagnosed and overtreated. Perls and Handelsman note that in the US, "sales of testosterone increased from $324 million in 2002 to $2 billion in 2012, and the number of testosterone doses prescribed climbed from 100 million in 2007 to half a billion in 2012, not including the additional contributions from compounding pharmacies, Internet, and direct-to-patient clinic sales."

== Terminology ==
Late-onset hypogonadism is an endocrine condition as well as a result of aging.

The terms "male menopause" and "andropause" are used in the popular media but are misleading, as they imply a sudden change in hormone levels similar to what women experience in menopause. A decrease in libido in men as a result of age is sometimes colloquially referred to as penopause.

== Research directions ==
As of 2016, research was necessary to find better ways to measure testosterone and to be better able to understand the measurements in any given person, and to understand why some people with low testosterone do not present with symptoms and some with seemingly adequate levels do present with symptoms. Research was also necessary to better understand the cardiovascular risks of testosterone replacement therapy in older men.

A relationship between late-onset hypogonadism and risk of Alzheimer's disease has been hypothesized, and some small clinical studies have been conducted to investigate the prevention of Alzheimer's disease in men with late-onset hypogonadism; as of 2009, results were inconclusive.

== See also ==
- Androgen deficiency
- Menopause
- European Menopause and Andropause Society
