= Masculinizing hormone therapy =

Type of gender-affirming medical treatment

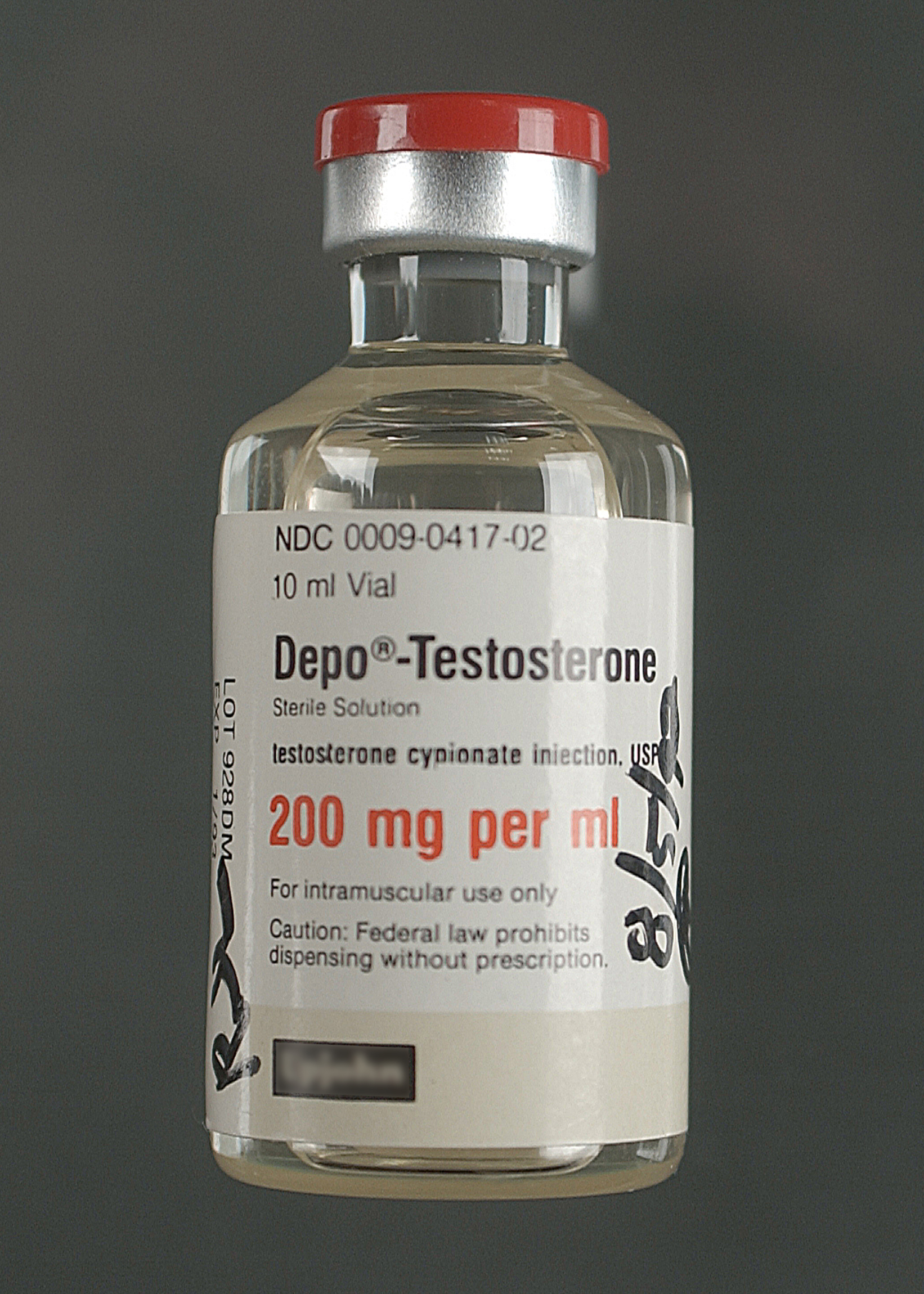
A 10 mL (2000 mg) vial of testosterone cypionate (brand name Depo-Testosterone).

Masculinizing hormone therapy is a form of transgender hormone therapy which develops male secondary sex characteristics and suppresses or minimizes female ones. It is typically used by trans men and transmasculine individuals as part of gender transition, to align their body with their gender identity. This can alleviate gender dysphoria, and help individuals be correctly perceived as their respective gender ("passing").

Masculinizing hormone therapy involves taking testosterone, the primary male sex hormone. This causes many of the same bodily changes seen in male puberty, including deeper vocal pitch, greater facial and body hair, heightened sex drive, muscle growth, fat redistribution, and enhanced size and sensitivity of the clitoris ("bottom growth"). It often stops menstruation, and reduces production of estrogen, the primary female sex hormone. It cannot reverse breast development, which may necessitate chest reconstruction ("top surgery").

Other medications used include GnRH agonists and antagonists to completely suppress estrogen and progesterone; progestins like medroxyprogesterone acetate to suppress menstruation; and 5α-reductase inhibitors to prevent pattern hair loss. Sometimes another androgen instead of testosterone may be used.

Similar hormone regimens may also be used by intersex people to conform to their assigned sex, starting either in childhood, or during puberty.

== History ==
Magnus Hirschfeld's Institut für Sexualwissenschaft in Berlin provided some early gender transition treatments to transgender men, such as mastectomies and counseling. Gerd Katter was a notable patient that received such services. However, masculinizing hormone therapy using testosterone was never offered at the clinic as synthetic testosterone was unavailable during the years of the clinic's operations.

Testosterone was first isolated in 1929 by Adolf Butendant. Various synthetic forms of testosterone subsequently became available. Michael Dillon is the first recorded transgender man to have been given testosterone solely for the purpose of gender transition. In 1939, Dillon was given testosterone pills by Dr. George Foss in Bristol, England.

== Requirements and accessibility ==
When starting masculinizing hormone therapy, ongoing monitoring is important. Healthcare providers check testosterone levels to evaluate how the body is responding and decide whether the dosage needs to be adjusted. Testosterone has the potential to increase red blood cell production, so blood tests help measure hemoglobin and hematocrit. Providers consider those results alongside physical changes, treatment goals, and other side effects when deciding whether the treatment plan needs to be adjusted. Monitoring schedules and recommendations may vary depending on the patient and healthcare provider.

== Contraindications ==
Absolute medical contraindications include:

- active pregnancy or attempting to become pregnant
- active sex hormone-sensitive cancer

Relative medical contraindications include:

- severe hypertension (high blood pressure)
- sleep apnea
- polycythemia
- prior history of hormone-sensitive (e.g. breast) cancer

== Safety ==
Due to insufficient comprehensive research, there is no consensus on the long-term effects of testosterone administration. Though it is not always the case, testosterone for transmasculine people is often intended to be used long-term.

A 2022 review entitled The efficacy, safety, and outcomes of testosterone use among transgender men patients: A review of the literature, while pointing out that more research is needed for newer therapies, concludes that:

More conventional therapies, including intramuscular injections, subcutaneous injections, and transdermal gels, have been extensively studied and show promising efficacy and outcomes with limited safety concerns.

== Interactions ==
Testosterone is metabolized by the cytochrome P450 enzyme system (specifically CYP3A isoforms) in the liver. There are certain drugs that increase or decrease the activity of cytochrome P450 enzymes and may cause increased or decreased levels of testosterone:

- Enzyme inducers – May cause decreased levels of testosterone (and other sex steroid) levels: Phenobarbital and phenytoin (seizure medicines), rifampin (antibiotic), and alcohol.
- Enzyme inhibitors – May cause increased levels of testosterone: Nefazodone, fluoxetine, paroxetine (antidepressants), itraconazole, fluconazole, and other azole antifungals, cimetidine (an anti-ulcer agent that can cause gynecomastia in men because of this effect), clarithromycin and other macrolide antibiotics, and protease inhibitors (HIV treatment).

Testosterone can also alter the effects of other drugs:

- Increases the blood thinning effect of warfarin;
- Decreases the effectiveness of propranolol, a nonselective beta blocker used in the management of cardiovascular conditions;
- Increases the effect of some oral medicines for diabetes and can cause dangerously low blood sugar levels.

Because of these interactions, it is advised that people taking masculinizing hormones make their healthcare providers aware of their hormone therapy when this is relevant to their treatment for other medical issues.

== Medications ==
Medications used in hormone therapy for transgender men include androgens and anabolic steroids like testosterone (by injection and other routes) to produce masculinization, suppress estrogen and progesterone levels, and prevent/reverse feminization; GnRH agonists and antagonists to suppress estrogen and progesterone levels; progestins like medroxyprogesterone acetate to suppress menses; and 5α-reductase inhibitors to prevent/reverse scalp hair loss.

Medications and dosages used in transgender men
Medication	Brand name	Type	Route	Dosage (Note: The natural production of testosterone by the male testes is between 3 and 11 mg per day.)
Testosterone undecanoate	Andriol, Jatenzo	Androgen	Oral	40–80 mg up to three times/day
Testosterone	Striant	Androgen	Buccal	30mg twice daily
Testosterone	Natesto	Androgen	Nasal spray	11mg three times daily
Testosterone	AndroGel (Note: Also available under other brand names.)	Androgen	TD gel	25–100mg/day
Testosterone	Androderm	Androgen	TD patch	2.5–10mg/day
Testosterone	Axiron	Androgen	TD liquid	30–120mg/day
Testosterone	Testopel	Androgen	SC	150–600mg every 3–6 months
Testosterone enanthate	Delatestryl	Androgen	IM, SC	50–100mg once/week or 100–250mg every 2–4 wks
Testosterone cypionate	Depo-Test	Androgen	IM, SC	50–100mg once/week or 100–250mg every 2–4 wks
Testosterone isobutyrate	Agovirin Depot	Androgen	IM, SC	50–100mg once/week
Mixed testosterone esters	Sustanon 250	Androgen	IM, SC	250mg every 2–3 wks or 500mg every 3–6 wks
Testosterone undecanoate	Aveed	Androgen	IM, SC	750–1,000mg every 10–14 wks
Nandrolone decanoate	Deca-Durabolin	Androgen	IM, SC	?
GnRH analogues	Various	GnRH modulator	Various	Variable
Elagolix	Orilissa	GnRH antagonist	Oral	150mg/day or 200mg twice/day
Medroxyprogesterone acetate (Note: For suppression of menses.)	Provera	Progestin	Oral	5–10mg/day
Medroxyprogesterone acetate	Depo-Provera	Progestin	IM	150mg every 3 months
Medroxyprogesterone acetate	Depo-SubQ Provera 104	Progestin	SC	104mg every 3 months
Lynestrenol	Orgametril	Progestin	Oral	5–10mg/day
Finasteride (Note: For prevention/treatment of scalp hair loss.)	Propecia	5αR inhibitor	Oral	1mg/day
Dutasteride	Avodart	5αR inhibitor	Oral	0.5mg/day

=== Testosterone ===
The elimination half-life of testosterone in the blood is around 10 and 100 minutes, so it is necessary to have a continuous supply of the hormone for masculinization.

A study of 45 FtM individuals randomly assigned to receive testoviron depot (intramuscular, 100 mg/10 days), testosterone gel (50 mg/day), or testosterone undecanoate (intramuscular, 1000 mg) found increased lean body mass, decreased fat mass, decreased high-density plasma lipoprotein levels, increased low-density lipoprotein levels, and increased prothrombin time. No differences were found between the different formulations of testosterone, and at week 54 all subjects were amenorrheic (no longer experiencing menstrual periods).

1 year after treatment, general life satisfaction was increased in all subjects.

==== Injected ====
"Depot" drug formulations are created by mixing a substance with the drug that slows its release and prolongs the action of the drug. The two primarily used forms in the United States are the testosterone esters testosterone cypionate (Depo-Testosterone) and testosterone enanthate (Delatestryl or Xyosted) which are almost interchangeable. Testosterone enanthate is purported to be slightly better with respect to even testosterone release, but this is probably more of a concern for bodybuilders who use the drugs at higher doses (250–1000 mg/week) than the replacement doses used by transgender men (50–100 mg/week). These testosterone esters are mixed with different oils, so some individuals may tolerate one better than the other. Testosterone enanthate costs more than testosterone cypionate and is more typically the one prescribed for hypogonadal males in the US. Testosterone cypionate is more popular in the US than elsewhere (especially amongst bodybuilders). Other formulations exist but are more difficult to come by in the US. A formulation of injected testosterone available in Europe and the US, testosterone undecanoate (Nebido, Aveed) provides significantly improved testosterone delivery with far less variation outside the eugonadal range than other formulations with injections required only four times yearly. However, each quarterly dose requires an injection of 4 mL of oil which may require multiple simultaneous injections. Testosterone undecanoate is also much more expensive as it is still under patent protection. Testosterone propionate is another testosterone ester that is widely available, including in the US, Canada, and Europe, but it is very short-acting compared to the other testosterone esters and must be administered once every 2 or 3 days, and for this reason, is rarely used.

The adverse side effects of injected testosterone esters are generally associated with high peak levels in the first few days after an injection. Some side effects may be ameliorated by using a shorter dosing interval (weekly or every ten days instead of twice monthly with testosterone enanthate or testosterone cypionate). 100 mg weekly gives a much lower peak level of testosterone than does 200 mg every two weeks, while still maintaining the same total dose of androgen. This benefit must be weighed against the discomfort and inconvenience of doubling the number of injections.

Injectable forms of testosterone can cause a lung problem called pulmonary oil microembolism (POME). Symptoms of POME include cough, shortness of breath, tightening of the throat, chest pain, sweating, dizziness, and fainting. A postmarketing analysis by the manufacturer of Aveed (testosterone undeconate injection) found that POME occurred at a rate of less than 1% per injection per year for Aveed.

==== Transdermal ====
Testosterone patches, creams, and gels are available. Both approximate normal physiological levels of testosterone better than the higher peaks associated with injection. Both can cause local skin irritation (more so with the patches).

Patches slowly diffuse testosterone through the skin and are replaced daily. The cost varies, as with all medication, from country to country, it is about $150/month in the US, and about €60 in Germany. Transdermal testosterone has the advantage of delivering a consistent supply of hormones over a given period and having a simple method of diffusion.

Transdermal testosterone is available throughout the world under the brand names Andromen Forte, Androgel, Testogel and Testim. They are absorbed quickly when applied and produce a temporary drug depot in the skin which diffuses into the circulation, peaking at 4 hours and decreasing slowly over the rest of the day. The cost varies, as with all medication, from country to country, from as little as $50/month to about $280/month.

Transdermal testosterone poses a risk of inadvertent exposure to others who come in contact with the patient's skin. This is most important for patients whose intimate partners are pregnant or those who are parents of young children as both of these groups are more vulnerable to the masculinizing effects of androgens. Case reports of significant virilization of young children after exposure to topical androgen preparations (both prescription and 'supplement' products) used by their caregivers demonstrates this very real risk; the same principle also applies to estrogens.

==== Implants ====
Implants, as subcutaneous pellets, can be used to deliver testosterone (brand name Testopel). 6 to 12 pellets are inserted under the skin every three months. This must be done in a physician's office, but is a relatively minor procedure done under local anesthetic. Pellets cost about $60 each, so the cost is greater than injected testosterone when the cost of the physician visit and procedure are included. The primary advantages of Testopel are that it gives a much more constant blood level of testosterone yet requires attention only four times yearly.

==== Oral ====
Oral testosterone is provided exclusively as testosterone undecanoate. It is available in Europe and Canada, but not in the US. Once absorbed from the gastrointestinal tract, testosterone is shunted (at very high blood levels) to the liver where it can cause liver damage (albeit very rarely) and worsens some of the adverse effects of testosterone, like lower HDL cholesterol. In addition, the first-pass metabolism of the liver also may result in testosterone levels too low to provide satisfactory masculinization and suppress menses. Because of the short terminal half-life of testosterone, oral testosterone undecanoate must be administered two to four times per day, preferably with food (which improves its absorption).

==== Sublingual and buccal ====
In 2003, the FDA approved a buccal form of testosterone (Striant). Sublingual testosterone can also be made by some compounding pharmacies. Cost for Striant is greater than other formulations (US$180–210/month). Testosterone is absorbed through the oral mucosa and avoids the first-pass metabolism in the liver which is the cause of many of the adverse effects of oral testosterone undecanoate. The lozenges can cause gum irritation, taste changes, and headache but most side effects diminish after two weeks. The lozenge is 'mucoadhesive' and must be applied twice daily.

=== Alternative androgens ===
==== Synthetic androgens ====
Synthetic androgens/anabolic steroids (AAS), like nandrolone (as an ester like nandrolone decanoate or nandrolone phenylpropionate), are agonists of the androgen receptor (AR) similarly to testosterone but are not usually used in HRT for transgender men or for androgen replacement therapy (ART) in cisgender men. However, they can be used in place of testosterone with similar effects, and can have certain advantages like less or no local potentiation in so-called androgenic tissues that express 5α-reductase like the skin and hair follicles (which results in a reduced rate of skin and hair-related side effects like excessive body hair growth and scalp hair loss), although this can also be disadvantageous in certain aspects of masculinization like facial hair growth and normal body hair growth). Although many AAS are not potentiated in androgenic tissues, they have similar effects to testosterone in other tissues like bone, muscle, fat, and the voice box. Also, many AAS, like nandrolone esters, are aromatized into estrogens to a greatly reduced extent relative to testosterone or not at all, and for this reason, are associated with reduced or no estrogenic effects (e.g., gynecomastia). AAS that are 17α-alkylated like methyltestosterone, oxandrolone, and stanozolol are orally active but carry a high risk of liver damage, whereas AAS that are not 17α-alkylated, like nandrolone esters, must be administered by intramuscular injection (via which they act as long-lasting depots similarly to testosterone esters) but have no more risk of liver damage than does testosterone.

For the sake of clarification, the term "anabolic–androgenic steroid" is essentially synonymous with "androgen" (or with "anabolic steroid"), and that natural androgens like testosterone are also AAS. These drugs all share the same core mechanism of action of acting as agonists of the AR and have similar effects, although their potency, pharmacokinetics, oral activity, ratio of anabolic to androgenic effects (due to differing capacities to be locally metabolized and potentiated by 5α-reductase), capacity for aromatization (i.e., conversion into an estrogen), and potential for liver damage may all differ.

==== Dihydrotestosterone ====
Dihydrotestosterone (DHT) (referred to as androstanolone or stanolone when used medically) can also be used in place of testosterone as an androgen. The availability of DHT is limited; it is not available in the United States or Canada, for instance, but it is available in certain European countries, including the United Kingdom, France, Spain, Belgium, Italy, and Luxembourg. DHT is available in formulations including topical gel, buccal or sublingual tablets, and as esters in oil for intramuscular injection. Relative to testosterone, and similarly to many synthetic AAS, DHT has the potential advantages of not being locally potentiated in so-called androgenic tissues that express 5α-reductase (as DHT is already 5α-reduced) and of not being aromatized into an estrogen (it is not a substrate for aromatase).

DHT is common androgen used by intersex men to initiate the development of masculine secondary sex characteristics, particularly for individuals with partial androgen insensitivity syndrome (who are often assigned female at birth). As the masculinizing effects of testosterone is limited in AIS, DHT more easily binds to androgen receptors and cannot be directly converted into estrogen via the androgen backdoor pathway, this is useful as an androgen treatment for AIS as testosterone can often result in unintentional feminizing effects such as breast growth and hip widening. DHT can be converted into testosterone which can be aromatased into estrogen however this is low.

=== Gonadotropin-releasing hormone modulator analogues ===
In all people, the hypothalamus releases gonadotropin-releasing hormone (GnRH) to stimulate the pituitary to produce luteinizing hormone (LH) and follicle-stimulating hormone (FSH) which in turn cause the gonads to produce sex steroids.

In adolescents, GnRH analogues such as leuprorelin can be used to suspend the advance of sex steroid induced, inappropriate pubertal changes for a period without inducing any changes in the gender-appropriate direction. GnRH analogues work by initially overstimulating the pituitary gland then rapidly desensitizing it to the effects of GnRH. Over a period of weeks, gonadal androgen production is greatly reduced.

The WPATH permits GnRH from Tanner stage 2. The sex steroids do have important other functions. The high cost of GnRH analogues is often a significant factor.

=== Antiestrogens ===
Antiestrogens (or so-called "estrogen blockers") like aromatase inhibitors (AIs) (e.g., anastrozole) or selective estrogen receptor modulators (SERMs) (e.g., tamoxifen) can be used to reduce the effects of high levels of endogenous estrogen (e.g., breast development, feminine fat distribution) in transgender men. In addition, in those who have not yet undergone or completed epiphyseal closure (which occurs during adolescence and is mediated by estrogen), antiestrogens can prevent hip widening as well as increase final height (estrogen limits height by causing the epiphyses to fuse).

=== Others ===
==== 5α-Reductase inhibitors ====
5α-Reductase inhibitors like finasteride and dutasteride can be used to slow or prevent scalp hair loss and excessive body hair growth in transgender men taking testosterone. However, they may also slow or reduce certain aspects of masculinization, such as facial hair growth, normal male-pattern body hair growth, and possibly clitoral enlargement. A potential solution is to start taking a 5α-reductase inhibitor after these desired aspects of masculinization have been well-established.

==== Progestogens ====
Progestogens can be used to control menstruation in transgender men. Depot medroxyprogesterone acetate (DMPA) may be injected every three months just as it is used for contraception. Generally after the first cycle, menses are greatly reduced or eliminated. This may be useful for transgender men prior to initiation of testosterone therapy.

==== Growth hormone ====
In those who have not yet started or completed epiphyseal closure, growth hormone can be administered, potentially in conjunction with an aromatase inhibitor or a GnRH analogue, to increase final height.

== Effects ==
The main effects of testosterone in trans men are as follows:

Reversible changes

- Increased libido
- Redistribution of body fat
- Cessation of ovulation and menstruation
- Increased musculature
- Increased sweat and changes in body odor
- Prominence of veins and coarser skin
- Acne (especially in the first few years of therapy)
- Alterations in blood lipids (cholesterol and triglycerides)
- Increased red blood cell count

Irreversible changes

- Deepening of the voice
- Growth of facial and body hair
- Male-pattern baldness (in some individuals)
- Enlargement of the clitoris
- Growth spurt and closure of growth plates if given before the end of puberty
- Breast atrophy – possible shrinking and/or softening of breasts

=== Physical changes ===
==== Skin changes ====
- Increased activity of oil and sweat glands.
- Change in body odor – less sweet and musky, more metallic and acrid.
- If severe odor is a problem, an antibacterial soap like chlorhexidine may be used in the armpits when showering. After 1–2 weeks of daily use, a noticeable decrease in odor should occur.
- Acne: generally worse the first few years of testosterone therapy (mimicking puberty). Can be treated with standard acne therapy. Initial treatment is with increased cleansing (at least twice daily) with an anti-acne or oil reducing scrub. If this doesn't work, additional therapy may be prescribed by a physician.
- Some physicians see acne as a contraindication to increasing testosterone dose.

==== Hair changes ====
- The action of testosterone on hair follicles is mainly due to the more potent androgen, dihydrotestosterone, DHT.
- With androgen therapy, genetics primarily determines how much hair will develop (and where) as well as whether male pattern baldness will develop.
- Testosterone is converted (within the cells of the hair follicle's dermal papilla) by 5α-reductase to DHT. There are two forms of this enzyme: type 1 and 2. However, type 2 is the form that is most important to the development of male pattern hair loss. Males with congenital 5α-reductase type 2 deficiency (but functional 5α-reductase type 1) never develop male-pattern hair loss.

==== Facial changes ====
Facial changes develop gradually over time, and sexual dimorphism (physical difference between the sexes) tends to increase with age. Within a population of similar body size and ethnicity:

- Brow: Males tend to develop heavier bony brows than females, thus HRT results in a more prominent brow.
- Cheeks: Female cheeks tend to be fuller and more rounded. Under the influence of estrogen, fat is deposited beneath the skin and overall facial and body contours become softer. This is reversed by androgens, resulting in a male-type fat distribution after hormone therapy.
- Nose: The tips of the nasal bones tend to grow more in males than females, creating a larger (longer or wider) nose. Thus, androgens result in the development of the nose.
- Jaw: The jaw in males tends to grow wider and more deeply sculptured than in females, thus the jaw widens under androgens.
- Larynx: At puberty, the bones and cartilage of the voicebox tend to enlarge less in females than males. In most males, the larynx becomes visible as a bony "Adam's apple," which is developed in transgender men under hormone therapy.
- Lips: Females, tend to have thicker, fleshier lips than males of the same size due to estrogen. Thus, after being administered androgens, transgender men may have a fat redistribution that results in smaller lips.

==== Endocrine and gynecological changes ====
- Menses typically ceases within 6 months of testosterone therapy (often sooner), however, it is not uncommon for menstruation to continue for longer. A retrospective chart review of 74 menstruating individuals treated with intramuscular injected testosterone found that 4 stopped after the first shot, 37 stopped within 6 months, 24 stopped after 6 months, and 9 required additional progesterone therapy. The time to menstrual cessation was individualized, with only a small correlation to testosterone dosage.
- Clitoromegaly occurs, and frequently reaches its apex within 2–3 years of therapy. Sizes generally range from 3–8 cm with 4–5 cm being about average. This is genetically determined, but some physicians advocate topical clitoral testosterone as an adjunct to growth before metoidioplasty. However, this testosterone is absorbed and should be calculated into one's total regimen.
- After long-term androgen therapy, ovaries may develop polyendocrine metabolic ovarian syndrome (PMOS) morphology, as both PMOS and transgender men there is an up-regulation of testosterone receptors in the ovaries. Untreated PMOS is associated with a possibly increased risk of endometrial cancer as well as decreased fertility.
- It is unknown whether the risk of ovarian cancer is increased, decreased or unchanged in transgender men compared to women. It is unlikely to be determined in the near future because ovarian cancer is a relatively rare disease and the population of transgender men is too small to do the appropriate study. However, it has been recommended by some physicians that transgender men have an oophorectomy within 2–5 years of starting androgen therapy due to the possible increased risk. (Note: Testosterone dose can frequently be decreased after oophorectomy.)
- The risk of endometrial cancer is similarly unknown. A large multicenter study along with review of previous studies, noted no increased prevalence of endometrial hyperplasia or malignancy in transgender men undergoing hysterectomy. However while the endometrial linings in these studies were noted to be thin, they remained histologically active.
- Growth of prostate tissue has been documented in transmasculine individuals on testosterone therapy.

Frequently the first sign of endometrial cancer is bleeding in post-menopausal women. Transgender men who have any bleeding after the cessation of menses with androgen therapy should be evaluated for age appropriate causes of abnormal uterine bleeding as per cisgender female guidelines.

- Adults with a uterus/cervix are advised to have a Pap smear per guidelines (Human papillomavirus infection). Use of testosterone is no exception to this rule.
- Some transgender men report a decrease in breast size with androgen therapy. However, no morphological changes were found when this was studied and likely it is due to loss of fat in the breasts.
- Androgen therapy (and suppression of estrogen production) may cause vaginal atrophy and dryness, which may result in dyspareunia (painful vaginal intercourse). This can be alleviated with topical estrogen cream.
- Most transgender men report a significantly increased libido. Some report that this decreases somewhat after several years on testosterone.
- While testosterone decreases ovulation, it is not an approved form of contraception; transgender men who engage in sex which places them at risk for pregnancy should be counseled on utilizing concomitant contraception. All contraceptive methods are acceptable for use.

==== Reproductive changes ====
- As the age at which transgender people begin therapy decreases, retention of reproductive potential may become more important to some.
- If a transgender man has not undergone hysterectomy and oophorectomy, he may regain fertility on cessation of testosterone. With the ovarian changes of long-term androgen therapy, however, it may require months of cessation of testosterone and possibly assistive reproductive technology to become pregnant. Testosterone must be withheld for the duration of pregnancy.
- If a transgender man is planning on having a hysterectomy/oophorectomy, future reproduction may still be preserved by:
  - Oocyte banking – hormonal stimulation to 'hyper-ovulate' with transvaginal oocyte harvest for freezing. Previously using the "slow-freezing" cryopreservation method there were very poor survival rates of banked oocytes. However, the advent of vitrification, a rapid freezing process, has made oocyte cryopreservation a viable option for fertility preservation. It allows the possibility for eggs to later be fertilized and be placed in a surrogate, as opposed to a transgender man having to carry the pregnancy himself.
  - Embryo banking – oocyte harvest as above with immediate fertilization and banking of the embryo. The sperm donor must be chosen before oophorectomy. Allows the possibility for embryos to later be placed in a surrogate, as opposed to a transgender man having to carry the pregnancy himself.
  - Ovarian tissue banking – Ovarian tissue is frozen after oophorectomy. Even after long-term androgen therapy, ovaries usually retain usable follicles. Eventual use of frozen ovaries will require replantation into the transgender man for stimulation and harvest, but may eventually be possible in a lab as techniques for tissue culture improve. This option does not usually allow for placement into a surrogate as it may require the use of immunosuppressants on the part of the surrogate.

=== Neurological changes ===
- Headaches: Pre-existing migraine headaches can be significantly worsened with androgen therapy. Headaches can also become problematic in men without prior headache disorders.
- Epilepsy: some seizure disorders are androgen-dependent. These may be worsened or (very rarely) unmasked with androgen therapy.
- Sleep deprivation worsens almost all seizure disorders, so concurrent obstructive sleep apnea caused or worsened by androgen therapy may also be responsible.
- Recent studies have found that cross-hormone therapy in trans men results in an increase in brain volume up to male proportions.

=== Psychological changes ===
The psychological changes are harder to define, since HRT is usually the first physical action that takes place when transitioning. This fact alone has a significant psychological impact, which is hard to distinguish from hormonally induced changes. Most trans men report an increase of energy and an increased sex drive. Many also report feeling more confident.

While a high level of testosterone is often associated with an increase in aggression, this is not a noticeable effect in most trans men. HRT doses of testosterone are much lower than the typical doses taken by steroid-using athletes, and create testosterone levels comparable to those of most cisgender men. These levels of testosterone have not been proven to cause more aggression than comparable levels of estrogen.

Some transgender men report mood swings, increased anger, and increased aggressiveness after starting androgen therapy. Studies are limited and small scale, however, based on self reporting over a short period of time (7 months). In a study by Motta et al., trans men also reported better anger control. Many transgender men, however, report improved mood, decreased emotional lability, and a lessening of anger and aggression.

A randomized clinical trial on the effects of testosterone therapy in a group of transgender and gender expansive adults found that the group given treatment had significantly reduced dysphoria, depression, and suicidality relative to the control group.

=== Health-related changes ===
==== Cardiovascular changes ====
- In cisgender men, testosterone levels that are either significantly above or below normal are associated with increased cardiovascular risk. This may be causative or simply a correlation.
- A single retrospective study in the medical literature of 293 trans men treated with testosterone (range of 2 months to 41 years) by the Amsterdam Gender Dysphoria Clinic from 1975 to 1994 showed no increase in cardiovascular mortality or morbidity when compared with the general female Dutch population. (As with all scientific studies, this does not conclusively prove that no causal link exists. A small to moderate detrimental effect remains a possibility, though a very large effect is more unlikely.)
- Androgen therapy can adversely affect the blood lipid profile by causing decreases in HDL (good) cholesterol, increases in LDL (bad) cholesterol, and increases in triglycerides.
- Androgen therapy redistributes the fat toward abdominal obesity, which is associated with increased cardiovascular risk rather than fat carried on the buttocks and hips.
- Androgen therapy can cause weight gain and decreased insulin sensitivity (perhaps worsening a predisposition to develop Type II diabetes).
- Androgen therapy effects are not all negative, however. Acutely it causes dilation of the coronary arteries, and in men with testosterone levels within the normal physiological range, higher levels are actually associated with a slight decrease in cardiovascular disease.
- Supra-physiological levels of androgens (generally due to abuse) are associated with significantly increased risks of strokes and heart attacks (even in the young).
- Cardiovascular risk factors are more than additive. (If high blood pressure is worth 10 and smoking is worth 10, together they are worth more than 20.) So for transgender men, the addition of risk with androgen therapy makes improving modifiable risk factors more important.
- The most important modifiable risk factor for many men is smoking.
- In pre-clinical models, testosterone XHT has been shown to lead to adverse cardiovascular effects, but adding a low-dose estrogen to that hormone therapy completely mitigated those effects. (Goetz LG, et al. "Addition of Estradiol to Cross-sex Testosterone Therapy Reduces Atherosclerosis Plaque Formation in Female ApoE -/- Mice." Endocrinology. 2017)

==== Gastrointestinal changes ====
- There is a risk of liver damage and liver cancer with all testosterone formulations, but this is minimal with all forms except oral or unless very high levels are administered. However, as with any drug that carries even a small risk of liver damage, liver function tests (or at least ALT) should be periodically monitored.

==== Metabolic changes ====
- Testosterone increases body weight (and increases appetite). The form that this weight gain will take depends on diet and exercise as well as genetic factors. Since testosterone has anabolic effects, gain of lean muscle mass will be easier than it previously was for transgender men. Moderate amounts of exercise will cause greater gains and will ameliorate some of the adverse effects of testosterone.
- Many transgender men report an increased energy level, decreased need for sleep, and increased alertness after testosterone therapy.
- In cisgender men, abnormally high or low levels of testosterone are both associated with insulin resistance (which eventually can result in Type II diabetes). So mid-normal levels of testosterone are the target for androgen therapy.
- In women, increased levels of either estrogen or androgens are associated with decreased insulin sensitivity (which may predispose to diabetes). In a study of transgender males and females, decreased insulin sensitivity was found in both populations after four months of hormonal treatment.

==== Bone changes ====
- Both estrogens and androgens are necessary for both cisgender males and females for healthy bone. (Young healthy women produce about 10 mg of testosterone monthly. Higher bone mineral density in males is associated with higher serum estrogen.)
- Bone is not static. It is constantly being reabsorbed and created. Osteoporosis results when bone formation occurs at a rate less than bone resorption.
- Estrogen is the predominant sex hormone that slows bone loss (even in men).
- Both estrogen and testosterone help stimulate bone formation (T, especially at puberty).
- Testosterone may cause an increase in cortical bone thickness in transgender men (however this does not necessarily translate to a greater mechanical stability).
- Transgender men who have been oophorectomized must continue androgen therapy to avoid premature osteoporosis. Estrogen supplementation is theoretically not usually necessary, as some of the injected testosterone will be aromatized into estrogen sufficient to maintain bone (as it does in cisgender men). However, a single small study of trans men after oophorectomy demonstrated that androgens alone may be insufficient to slow bone loss. It is likely the case that pre-oophorectomy, residual estrogen production is protective. However, after oophorectomy, some trans men may have insufficient estrogen to slow bone loss.
- Pre-clinical research has suggested the importance of low-dose estrogen supplementation for those beginning cross-sex hormone therapy (XHT) during adolescence.
- Some physicians advocate a Dexa (bone density) scan at the time of oophorectomy and every year or two thereafter to diagnose osteoporosis before it becomes severe enough to be symptomatic. This is important because the treatment of osteoporosis is most effective if done early.
- Daily calcium supplementation and possibly Vitamin D3 and K2 are probably a good idea for most transgender men, but it is even more important after removal of the ovaries.

==== Obstructive sleep apnea ====
- OSA may be worsened or unmasked by androgen therapy.
- Risk is higher in transgender men who are obese, smoke, or have COPD (Chronic Obstructive Pulmonary Disease).
- Untreated OSA may have significant adverse effects on the heart, blood pressure, mood, and may cause headaches and worsen seizure disorders.
- Symptoms of OSA are noisy sleeping (snoring), excessive daytime sleepiness, morning headache, personality changes, and problems with judgment, memory, and attention.

==== Polycythemia ====
- Increased red blood cell mass usually from overproduction by the bone marrow.
- Testosterone (frequently in large doses) was previously used to treat anemia from bone marrow failure.
- A transgender man's hematocrit (the percentage of whole blood made up of red blood cells) should be judged against normal age-adjusted values for men.
- Therapy is via phlebotomy (periodic therapeutic blood draws similar to blood donation).
- Tendency to become polycythemic worsens with age.
- Worse with injected testosterone (especially with longer intervals between doses) than with oral, transdermal, or Testopel. (Increase in RBCs occurs with the very high peaks from the injection. So decreasing dose and interval to 7–10 days instead of 14 may help.)
- Severe polycythemia predisposes to both venous and arterial thrombosis (blood clots) such as: deep venous thrombosis, pulmonary embolism, heart attack, and stroke.
- Aspirin may decrease the risk.

== Hormone levels ==
During HRT, especially in the early stages of treatment, blood tests should be consistently done to assess hormone levels and liver function.

Gianna Israel and colleagues have suggested that for pre-oophorectomy trans men, therapeutic testosterone levels should optimally fall within the normal male range, whereas estrogen levels should optimally fall within the normal female range. Before oophorectomy, it is difficult and frequently impractical to fully suppress estrogen levels into the normal male range, especially with exogenous testosterone aromatizing into estrogen, hence why the female ranges are referenced instead. In post-oophorectomy trans men, Israel and colleagues recommend that both testosterone and estrogen levels fall exactly within the normal male ranges. See the table below for all of the precise values they suggest.

Hormone	Cis female range	Cis male range	Optimal trans female range	Optimal trans male range
Estrogen (total)	40–450 pg/mL	< 40 pg/mL	400–800 pg/mL (pre-orchiectomy); 40–400 pg/mL (post-orchiectomy)	< 400 pg/mL (pre-oophorectomy) < 40 pg/mL (post-oophorectomy)
Testosterone (total)	25–95 ng/dL	225–900 ng/dL	95–225 ng/dL (pre-orchiectomy); 25–95 ng/dL (post-orchiectomy)	225–900 ng/dL (pre-oophorectomy); 225–900 ng/dL (post-oophorectomy)

The optimal ranges listed for testosterone only apply to individuals taking bioidentical hormones in the form of testosterone (including esters) and do not apply to those taking synthetic AAS (e.g., nandrolone) or dihydrotestosterone.

== See also ==
- Androgen replacement therapy
- Feminizing hormone therapy
- Hormone replacement therapy
