= Gonadopause =

Gonadopause may refer to:

- Menopause
- Andropause
