= C27H34O3 =

The molecular formula C_{27}H_{34}O_{3} (molar mass: 406.56 g/mol, exact mass: 406.2508 u) may refer to:

- Nandrolone phenylpropionate (NPP), or nandrolone phenpropionate
- Testosterone phenylacetate
