= Testosterone propionate =

Chemical compound

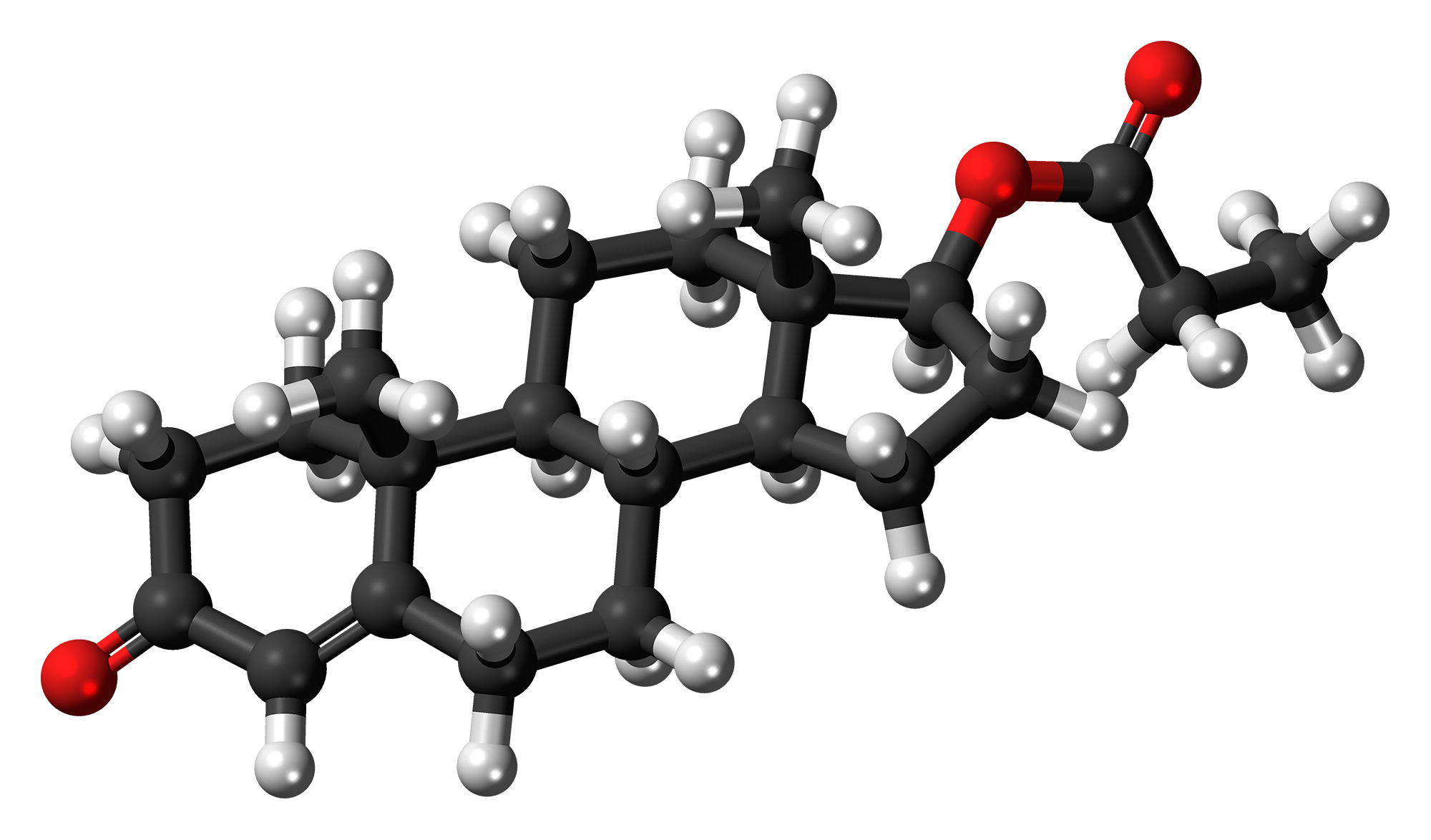

Clinical data
- Trade names: Testoviron, others
- Other names: TP; Testosterone propanoate; Testosterone 17β-propanoate; Propionyltestosterone; NSC-9166
- Routes of administration: Intramuscular injection, buccal
- Drug class: Androgen; Anabolic steroid; Androgen ester

Legal status
- Legal status: CA: Schedule IV; US: Schedule III

Pharmacokinetic data
- Bioavailability: Oral: very low Intramuscular: very high
- Metabolism: Liver
- Elimination half-life: Intramuscular: 0.8 days (~20 hours)
- Excretion: Urine

Identifiers
- IUPAC name: [(8R,9S,10R,13S,14S,17S)-10,13-dimethyl-3-oxo-1,2,6,7,8,9,11,12,14,15,16,17-dodecahydrocyclopenta[a]phenanthren-17-yl] propanoate
- CAS Number: 57-85-2
- PubChem CID: 5995
- DrugBank: DB01420
- ChemSpider: 5774
- UNII: WI93Z9138A
- KEGG: D00959
- ChEBI: CHEBI:9466
- ChEMBL: ChEMBL1170
- CompTox Dashboard (EPA): DTXSID9036515
- ECHA InfoCard: 100.000.319

Chemical and physical data
- Formula: C_{22}H_{32}O_{3}
- Molar mass: 344.495 g·mol^{−1}
- 3D model (JSmol): Interactive image
- SMILES: CCC(=O)O[C@H]1CC[C@@H]2[C@@]1(CC[C@H]3[C@H]2CCC4=CC(=O)CC[C@]34C)C
- InChI: InChI=1S/C22H32O3/c1-4-20(24)25-19-8-7-17-16-6-5-14-13-15(23)9-11-21(14,2)18(16)10-12-22(17,19)3/h13,16-19H,4-12H2,1-3H3/t16-,17-,18-,19-,21-,22-/m0/s1; Key:PDMMFKSKQVNJMI-BLQWBTBKSA-N

Testosterone propionate, sold under the brand name Testoviron among others, is an androgen and anabolic steroid (AAS) medication which is used mainly in the treatment of low testosterone levels in men. It has also been used to treat breast cancer in women. It is given by injection into muscle usually once every two to three days.

Side effects of testosterone propionate include symptoms of masculinization like acne, increased hair growth, voice changes, and increased sexual desire. Testosterone supplementation is also known to reduce the threshold for aggressive behavior in men. The drug is a synthetic androgen and anabolic steroid and hence is an agonist of the androgen receptor (AR), the biological target of androgens like testosterone and dihydrotestosterone (DHT). It has strong androgenic effects and moderate anabolic effects, which make it useful for producing masculinization and suitable for androgen replacement therapy. Testosterone propionate is a testosterone ester and a relatively short-acting prodrug of testosterone in the body. Because of this, it is considered to be a natural and bioidentical form of testosterone.

Testosterone propionate was discovered in 1936 and was introduced for medical use in 1937. It was the first testosterone ester to be marketed, and was the major form of testosterone used in medicine until about 1960. The introduction of longer-acting testosterone esters like testosterone enanthate, testosterone cypionate, and testosterone undecanoate starting in the 1950s resulted in testosterone propionate mostly being superseded. As such, it is rarely used today. In addition to its medical use, testosterone propionate is used to improve physique and performance. The drug is a controlled substance in many countries and so non-medical use is generally illicit.

== Medical uses ==
Testosterone propionate is used primarily in androgen replacement therapy. It is specifically approved for the treatment of hypogonadism in men, breast cancer, low sexual desire, delayed puberty in boys, and menopausal symptoms.

Androgen replacement therapy formulations and dosages used in men
Route	Medication	Major brand names	Form	Dosage
Oral	Testosterone^{a}	–	Tablet	400–800 mg/day (in divided doses)
Oral	Testosterone undecanoate	Andriol, Jatenzo, Kyzatrex	Capsule	40–80 mg/2–4× day (with meals)
Oral	Methyltestosterone^{b}	Android, Metandren, Testred	Tablet	10–50 mg/day
Oral	Fluoxymesterone^{b}	Halotestin, Ora-Testryl, Ultandren	Tablet	5–20 mg/day
Oral	Metandienone^{b}	Dianabol	Tablet	5–15 mg/day
Oral	Mesterolone^{b}	Proviron	Tablet	25–150 mg/day
Sublingual	Testosterone^{b}	Testoral	Tablet	5–10 mg 1–4×/day
Sublingual	Methyltestosterone^{b}	Metandren, Oreton Methyl	Tablet	10–30 mg/day
Buccal	Testosterone	Striant	Tablet	30 mg 2×/day
Buccal	Methyltestosterone^{b}	Metandren, Oreton Methyl	Tablet	5–25 mg/day
Transdermal	Testosterone	AndroGel, Testim, TestoGel	Gel	25–125 mg/day
Transdermal	Testosterone	Androderm, AndroPatch, TestoPatch	Non-scrotal patch	2.5–15 mg/day
Transdermal	Testosterone	Testoderm	Scrotal patch	4–6 mg/day
Transdermal	Testosterone	Axiron	Axillary solution	30–120 mg/day
Transdermal	Androstanolone (DHT)	Andractim	Gel	100–250 mg/day
Rectal	Testosterone	Rektandron, Testosteron^{b}	Suppository	40 mg 2–3×/day
Injection (IM or SC)	Testosterone	Andronaq, Sterotate, Virosterone	Aqueous suspension	10–50 mg 2–3×/week
Injection (IM or SC)	Testosterone propionate^{b}	Testoviron	Oil solution	10–50 mg 2–3×/week
Injection (IM or SC)	Testosterone enanthate	Delatestryl	Oil solution	50–250 mg 1x/1–4 weeks
Injection (IM or SC)	Testosterone enanthate	Xyosted	Auto-injector	50–100 mg 1×/week
Injection (IM or SC)	Testosterone cypionate	Depo-Testosterone	Oil solution	50–250 mg 1x/1–4 weeks
Injection (IM or SC)	Testosterone isobutyrate	Agovirin Depot	Aqueous suspension	50–100 mg 1x/1–2 weeks
Injection (IM or SC)	Testosterone phenylacetate^{b}	Perandren, Androject	Oil solution	50–200 mg 1×/3–5 weeks
Injection (IM or SC)	Mixed testosterone esters	Sustanon 100, Sustanon 250	Oil solution	50–250 mg 1×/2–4 weeks
Injection (IM or SC)	Testosterone undecanoate	Aveed, Nebido	Oil solution	750–1,000 mg 1×/10–14 weeks
Injection (IM or SC)	Testosterone buciclate^{a}	–	Aqueous suspension	600–1,000 mg 1×/12–20 weeks
Implant	Testosterone	Testopel	Pellet	150–1,200 mg/3–6 months
Notes: Men produce about 3 to 11 mg of testosterone per day (mean 7 mg/day in young men). Footnotes: ^{a} = Never marketed. ^{b} = No longer used and/or no longer marketed. Sources: See template.

Androgen replacement therapy formulations and dosages used in women
Route	Medication	Major brand names	Form	Dosage
Oral	Testosterone undecanoate	Andriol, Jatenzo	Capsule	40–80 mg 1x/1–2 days
Oral	Methyltestosterone	Metandren, Estratest	Tablet	0.5–10 mg/day
Oral	Fluoxymesterone	Halotestin	Tablet	1–2.5 mg 1x/1–2 days
Oral	Normethandrone^{a}	Ginecoside	Tablet	5 mg/day
Oral	Tibolone	Livial	Tablet	1.25–2.5 mg/day
Oral	Prasterone (DHEA)^{b}	–	Tablet	10–100 mg/day
Sublingual	Methyltestosterone	Metandren	Tablet	0.25 mg/day
Transdermal	Testosterone	Intrinsa	Patch	150–300 μg/day
Transdermal	Testosterone	AndroGel	Gel, cream	1–10 mg/day
Vaginal	Prasterone (DHEA)	Intrarosa	Insert	6.5 mg/day
Injection	Testosterone propionate^{a}	Testoviron	Oil solution	25 mg 1x/1–2 weeks
Injection	Testosterone enanthate	Delatestryl, Primodian Depot	Oil solution	25–100 mg 1x/4–6 weeks
Injection	Testosterone cypionate	Depo-Testosterone, Depo-Testadiol	Oil solution	25–100 mg 1x/4–6 weeks
Injection	Testosterone isobutyrate^{a}	Femandren M, Folivirin	Aqueous suspension	25–50 mg 1x/4–6 weeks
Injection	Mixed testosterone esters	Climacteron^{a}	Oil solution	150 mg 1x/4–8 weeks
Injection	Mixed testosterone esters	Omnadren, Sustanon	Oil solution	50–100 mg 1x/4–6 weeks
Injection	Nandrolone decanoate	Deca-Durabolin	Oil solution	25–50 mg 1x/6–12 weeks
Injection	Prasterone enanthate^{a}	Gynodian Depot	Oil solution	200 mg 1x/4–6 weeks
Implant	Testosterone	Testopel	Pellet	50–100 mg 1x/3–6 months
Notes: Premenopausal women produce about 230 ± 70 μg testosterone per day (6.4 ± 2.0 mg testosterone per 4 weeks), with a range of 130 to 330 μg per day (3.6–9.2 mg per 4 weeks). Footnotes: ^{a} = Mostly discontinued or unavailable. ^{b} = Over-the-counter. Sources: See template.

Androgen/anabolic steroid dosages for breast cancer
Route	Medication	Form	Dosage
Oral	Methyltestosterone	Tablet	30–200 mg/day
Oral	Fluoxymesterone	Tablet	10–40 mg 3x/day
Oral	Calusterone	Tablet	40–80 mg 4x/day
Oral	Normethandrone	Tablet	40 mg/day
Buccal	Methyltestosterone	Tablet	25–100 mg/day
Injection (IM or SC)	Testosterone propionate	Oil solution	50–100 mg 3x/week
Injection (IM or SC)	Testosterone enanthate	Oil solution	200–400 mg 1x/2–4 weeks
Injection (IM or SC)	Testosterone cypionate	Oil solution	200–400 mg 1x/2–4 weeks
Injection (IM or SC)	Mixed testosterone esters	Oil solution	250 mg 1x/week
Injection (IM or SC)	Methandriol	Aqueous suspension	100 mg 3x/week
Injection (IM or SC)	Androstanolone (DHT)	Aqueous suspension	300 mg 3x/week
Injection (IM or SC)	Drostanolone propionate	Oil solution	100 mg 1–3x/week
Injection (IM or SC)	Metenolone enanthate	Oil solution	400 mg 3x/week
Injection (IM or SC)	Nandrolone decanoate	Oil solution	50–100 mg 1x/1–3 weeks
Injection (IM or SC)	Nandrolone phenylpropionate	Oil solution	50–100 mg/week
Note: Dosages are not necessarily equivalent. Sources: See template.

=== Available forms ===
Testosterone propionate is usually provided as an oil solution for use by intramuscular injection. It was also previously available as an 30 mg or 50 mg aqueous suspension. Buccal tablets of testosterone propionate were previously available as well.

== Side effects ==
Side effects of testosterone propionate include virilization among others.

Testosterone propionate is often a painful injection, which is attributed to its short ester chain.

== Pharmacology ==
=== Pharmacodynamics ===
Androgenic vs. anabolic activity ratio of androgens/anabolic steroids
Medication	Ratio^{a}
Testosterone	~1:1
Androstanolone (DHT)	~1:1
Methyltestosterone	~1:1
Methandriol	~1:1
Fluoxymesterone	1:1–1:15
Metandienone	1:1–1:8
Drostanolone	1:3–1:4
Metenolone	1:2–1:3
Oxymetholone	1:2–1:9
Oxandrolone	1:13–1:3
Stanozolol	1:1–1:3
Nandrolone	1:3–1:16
Ethylestrenol	1:2–1:19
Norethandrolone	1:1–1:2
Notes: In rodents. Footnotes: ^{a} = Ratio of androgenic to anabolic activity. Sources: See template.

Testosterone propionate is a prodrug of testosterone and is an androgen and anabolic–androgenic steroid (AAS). That is, it is an agonist of the androgen receptor (AR).

=== Pharmacokinetics ===
Testosterone propionate is administered in oil via intramuscular injection. It has a relatively short elimination half-life and mean residence time of 2 days and 4 days, respectively. As such, it has a short duration of action and must be administered two to three times per week.

Intramuscular injection of testosterone propionate as an oil solution, aqueous suspension, and emulsion has been compared.

Pharmacokinetics of testosterone esters
Testosterone ester	Form	Route	T_{max}	t_{1/2}	MRT
Testosterone undecanoate	Oil-filled capsules	Oral	?	1.6 hours	3.7 hours
Testosterone propionate	Oil solution	Intramuscular injection	?	0.8 days	1.5 days
Testosterone enanthate	Castor oil solution	Intramuscular injection	10 days	4.5 days	8.5 days
Testosterone undecanoate	Tea seed oil solution	Intramuscular injection	13.0 days	20.9 days	34.9 days
Testosterone undecanoate	Castor oil solution	Intramuscular injection	11.4 days	33.9 days	36.0 days
Testosterone buciclate^{a}	Aqueous suspension	Intramuscular injection	25.8 days	29.5 days	60.0 days
Notes: Testosterone cypionate has similar pharmacokinetics to Testosterone enanthate. Footnotes: ^{a} = Never marketed. Sources: See template.

Parenteral durations of androgens/anabolic steroids
Medication	Form	Major brand names	Duration
Testosterone	Aqueous suspension	Andronaq, Sterotate, Virosterone	2–3 days
Testosterone propionate	Oil solution	Androteston, Perandren, Testoviron	3–4 days
Testosterone phenylpropionate	Oil solution	Testolent	8 days
Testosterone isobutyrate	Aqueous suspension	Agovirin Depot, Perandren M	14 days
Mixed testosterone esters^{a}	Oil solution	Triolandren	10–20 days
Mixed testosterone esters^{b}	Oil solution	Testosid Depot	14–20 days
Testosterone enanthate	Oil solution	Delatestryl	14–28 days
Testosterone cypionate	Oil solution	Depovirin	14–28 days
Mixed testosterone esters^{c}	Oil solution	Sustanon 250	28 days
Testosterone undecanoate	Oil solution	Aveed, Nebido	100 days
Testosterone buciclate^{d}	Aqueous suspension	20 Aet-1, CDB-1781^{e}	90–120 days
Nandrolone phenylpropionate	Oil solution	Durabolin	10 days
Nandrolone decanoate	Oil solution	Deca Durabolin	21–28 days
Methandriol	Aqueous suspension	Notandron, Protandren	8 days
Methandriol bisenanthoyl acetate	Oil solution	Notandron Depot	16 days
Metenolone acetate	Oil solution	Primobolan	3 days
Metenolone enanthate	Oil solution	Primobolan Depot	14 days
Note: All are via i.m. injection. Footnotes: ^{a} = TP, TV, and TUe. ^{b} = TP and TKL. ^{c} = TP, TPP, TiCa, and TD. ^{d} = Studied but never marketed. ^{e} = Developmental code names. Sources: See template.

== Chemistry ==
Testosterone propionate, or testosterone 17β-propanoate, is a synthetic androstane steroid and a derivative of testosterone. It is an androgen ester; specifically, it is the C17β propionate (propanoate) ester of testosterone.

Structural properties of major testosterone esters
Androgen	Structure	Ester				Relative mol. weight	Relative T content^{b}	logP^{c}
Androgen	Structure	Position(s)	Moiet(ies)	Type	Length^{a}	Relative mol. weight	Relative T content^{b}	logP^{c}
Testosterone		–	–	–	–	1.00	1.00	3.0–3.4
Testosterone propionate		C17β	Propanoic acid	Straight-chain fatty acid	3	1.19	0.84	3.7–4.9
Testosterone isobutyrate		C17β	Isobutyric acid	Branched-chain fatty acid	– (~3)	1.24	0.80	4.9–5.3
Testosterone isocaproate		C17β	Isohexanoic acid	Branched-chain fatty acid	– (~5)	1.34	0.75	4.4–6.3
Testosterone caproate		C17β	Hexanoic acid	Straight-chain fatty acid	6	1.35	0.75	5.8–6.5
Testosterone phenylpropionate		C17β	Phenylpropanoic acid	Aromatic fatty acid	– (~6)	1.46	0.69	5.8–6.5
Testosterone cypionate		C17β	Cyclopentylpropanoic acid	Cyclic carboxylic acid	– (~6)	1.43	0.70	5.1–7.0
Testosterone enanthate		C17β	Heptanoic acid	Straight-chain fatty acid	7	1.39	0.72	3.6–7.0
Testosterone decanoate		C17β	Decanoic acid	Straight-chain fatty acid	10	1.53	0.65	6.3–8.6
Testosterone undecanoate		C17β	Undecanoic acid	Straight-chain fatty acid	11	1.58	0.63	6.7–9.2
Testosterone buciclate^{d}		C17β	Bucyclic acid^{e}	Cyclic carboxylic acid	– (~9)	1.58	0.63	7.9–8.5
Footnotes: ^{a} = Length of ester in carbon atoms for straight-chain fatty acids or approximate length of ester in carbon atoms for aromatic or cyclic fatty acids. ^{b} = Relative testosterone content by weight (i.e., relative androgenic/anabolic potency). ^{c} = Experimental or predicted octanol/water partition coefficient (i.e., lipophilicity/hydrophobicity). Retrieved from PubChem, ChemSpider, and DrugBank. ^{d} = Never marketed. ^{e} = Bucyclic acid = trans-4-Butylcyclohexane-1-carboxylic acid. Sources: See individual articles.

== History ==
Testosterone esters were synthesized for the first time in 1936, and were found to have greatly improved potency relative to testosterone. Among the esters synthesized, testosterone propionate was the most potent, and for this reason, was selected for further development, subsequently being marketed. Testosterone propionate was introduced in 1937 by Schering AG in Germany under the brand name Testoviron. It was the first commercially available form of testosterone, and the first testosterone ester, to be introduced. The medication was the major form of testosterone used medically before 1960. Buccal testosterone propionate tablets were introduced for medical use in the mid-to-late 1940s under the brand name Oreton Buccal Tablets. An aqueous suspension of testosterone propionate was marketed by Ciba by 1950. In the 1950s, longer-acting testosterone esters like testosterone enanthate and testosterone cypionate were introduced and superseded testosterone propionate. Although rarely used nowadays due to its short duration, testosterone propionate remains medically available.

== Society and culture ==
=== Generic names ===
Testosterone propionate is the generic name of the drug and its USAN and BAN. It has also been referred to as testosterone propanoate or as propionyltestosterone.

=== Brand names ===
Testosterone propionate is or has been marketed under a variety of brand names, including, among numerous others:

- Agrovirin
- Andronate
- Andrusol-P
- Anertan
- Masenate
- Neo-Hombreol
- Oreton
- Perandren
- Synandrol
- Testoviron

=== Availability ===
Testosterone propionate is no longer available commercially in the United States except via a compounding pharmacy.

=== Legal status ===
Testosterone propionate, along with other AAS, is a schedule III controlled substance in the United States under the Controlled Substances Act and a schedule IV controlled substance in Canada under the Controlled Drugs and Substances Act.
