= Testosterone phenylacetate =

Chemical compound

Clinical data
- Trade names: Perandren, Androject
- Other names: TPA
- Routes of administration: Intramuscular injection
- Drug class: Androgen; Anabolic steroid; Androgen ester

Identifiers
- IUPAC name: [(8R,9S,10R,13S,14S,17S)-10,13-dimethyl-3-oxo-1,2,6,7,8,9,11,12,14,15,16,17-dodecahydrocyclopenta[a]phenanthren-17-yl] 2-phenylacetate
- CAS Number: 5704-03-0
- PubChem CID: 9931194
- ChemSpider: 8106825
- UNII: WAD1QAK81D
- KEGG: D06086
- ChEMBL: ChEMBL1697796
- CompTox Dashboard (EPA): DTXSID80972519

Chemical and physical data
- Formula: C_{27}H_{34}O_{3}
- Molar mass: 406.566 g·mol^{−1}
- 3D model (JSmol): Interactive image
- SMILES: C[C@]12CC[C@H]3[C@H]([C@@H]1CC[C@@H]2OC(=O)CC4=CC=CC=C4)CCC5=CC(=O)CC[C@]35C
- InChI: InChI=1S/C27H34O3/c1-26-14-12-20(28)17-19(26)8-9-21-22-10-11-24(27(22,2)15-13-23(21)26)30-25(29)16-18-6-4-3-5-7-18/h3-7,17,21-24H,8-16H2,1-2H3/t21-,22-,23-,24-,26-,27-/m0/s1; Key:WIJSFCWRMNIREB-ZLQWOROUSA-N

Testosterone phenylacetate (TPA; brand names Perandren, Androject) is an androgen and anabolic steroid and a testosterone ester. Analogously to estradiol benzoate having been one of the first estrogen esters to be introduced, testosterone phenylacetate was one of the first testosterone esters to be introduced. However, since its introduction, it has largely been replaced by other esters, such as testosterone propionate.

Testosterone phenylacetate was a 50 mg/mL microcrystalline aqueous suspension under the brand name Perandren. It was used at a dosage of 50 to 200 mg by intramuscular injection once every 2 to 5 weeks. The medication was used to treat hypogonadism and eunuchoidism in males and for palliation of breast cancer in females. It was developed by Ciba Pharmaceutical Company.

A study found that, measured by 17-ketosteroid excretion, 300 mg testosterone propionate in oil solution had a duration of 5 days, 300 mg testosterone propionate in aqueous suspension had a duration of 13 days, 353 mg testosterone cypionate in oil solution had a duration of 24 days, and 354 mg testosterone phenylacetate in aqueous suspension had a duration of 66 days. In 1955, testosterone phenylacetate in aqueous suspension was said to have the longest duration of any clinically used androgen marketed up to that point.

Testosterone phenylacetate in aqueous suspension by intramuscular injection, similarly to other aqueous suspension formulations, causes local injection site reactions, including local pain, swelling, and tenderness. These symptoms last for several days after the injection and then subside. These reactions do not typically occur with oil solutions. The injection site reactions were viewed as less important in the case of testosterone phenylacetate due to its prolonged duration and less frequent administration.

== See also ==
- List of androgen esters § Testosterone esters
