= Testosterone isobutyrate =

Chemical compound

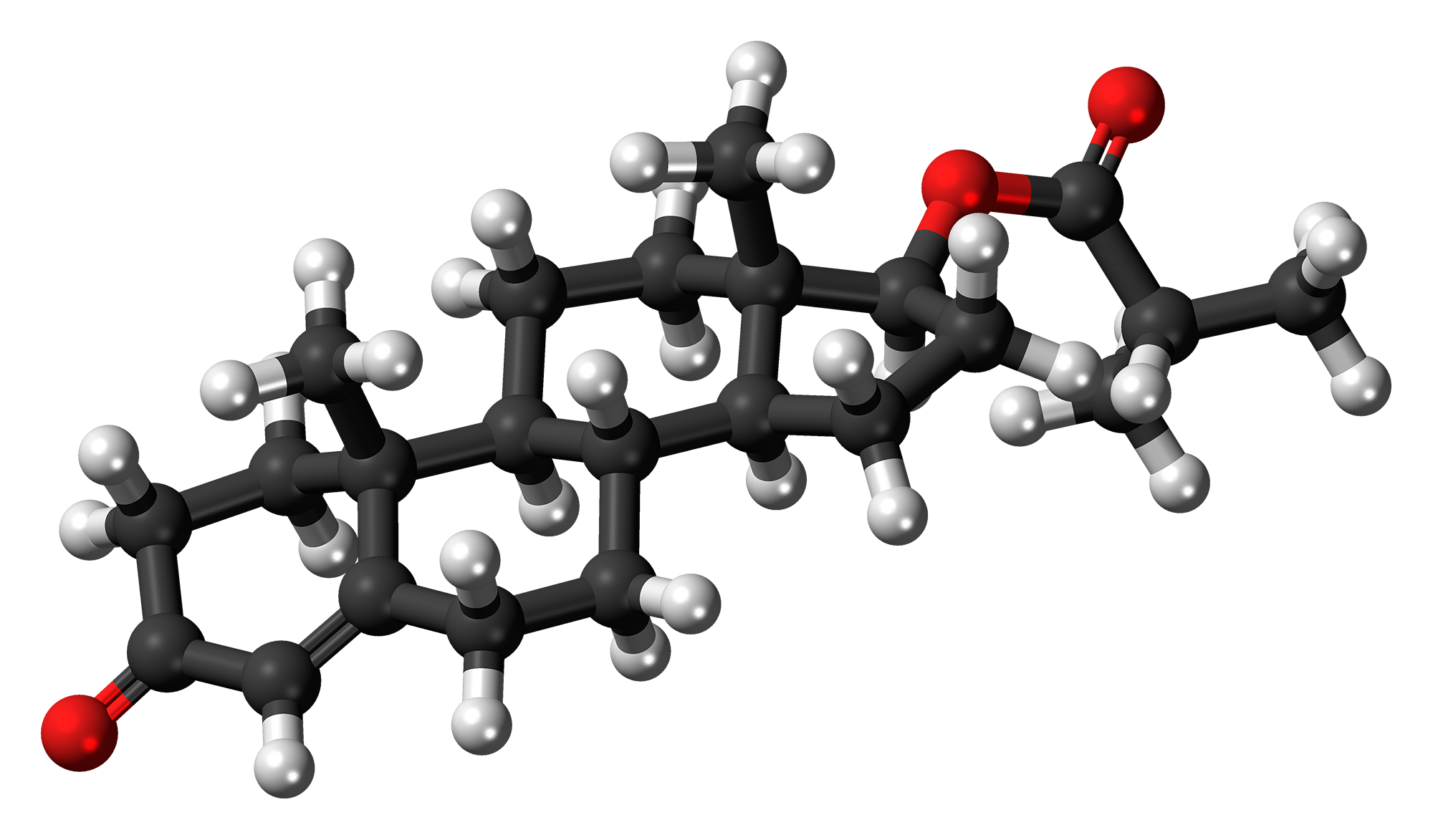

Clinical data
- Trade names: Agovirin-Depot, Perandren M, Testocryst, Virex-Cryst
- Routes of administration: Intramuscular injection
- Drug class: Androgen; Anabolic steroid; Androgen ester
- ATC code: G03BA03 (WHO)

Pharmacokinetic data
- Metabolites: Testosterone
- Duration of action: ~2 weeks

Identifiers
- IUPAC name: [(8R,9S,10R,13S,14S,17S)-10,13-dimethyl-3-oxo-1,2,6,7,8,9,11,12,14,15,16,17-dodecahydrocyclopenta[a]phenanthren-17-yl] 2-methylpropanoate
- CAS Number: 1169-49-9
- PubChem CID: 92149
- ChemSpider: 83194
- UNII: H0KNQ242J5
- CompTox Dashboard (EPA): DTXSID70151573
- ECHA InfoCard: 100.013.293

Chemical and physical data
- Formula: C_{23}H_{34}O_{3}
- Molar mass: 358.522 g·mol^{−1}
- 3D model (JSmol): Interactive image
- SMILES: CC(C)C(=O)O[C@H]1CC[C@@H]2[C@@]1(CC[C@H]3[C@H]2CCC4=CC(=O)CC[C@]34C)C
- InChI: InChI=1S/C23H34O3/c1-14(2)21(25)26-20-8-7-18-17-6-5-15-13-16(24)9-11-22(15,3)19(17)10-12-23(18,20)4/h13-14,17-20H,5-12H2,1-4H3/t17-,18-,19-,20-,22-,23-/m0/s1; Key:PYHZLMFTKOTWGQ-WAUHAFJUSA-N

Testosterone isobutyrate, sold under the brand names Agovirin-Depot and Perandren M among others, is an androgen and anabolic steroid medication and a testosterone ester which is used for indications such as low testosterone levels in men and delayed puberty in boys. It is available only in the Czech Republic and Slovakia. The medication is administered by injection into muscle once every 1 to 2 weeks in males. Unlike most other testosterone esters, which are provided as oil solutions, testosterone isobutyrate is formulated as a microcrystalline aqueous suspension.

== Medical uses ==
Testosterone isobutyrate is used in the treatment of hypogonadism in men and delayed puberty in adolescent boys. It is also used in the treatment of Klinefelter's syndrome, aplastic anemia, Cushing's syndrome (as an anabolic to preserve lean body mass), postmenopausal osteoporosis in women, advanced breast cancer in women, breast pain in women, and cachexia. Testosterone isobutyrate has been used in masculinizing hormone therapy for transgender men as well.

=== Available forms ===
Testosterone isobutyrate is provided in the form of a 25 mg/mL microcrystalline aqueous suspension packaged in 2 mL ampoules (5 ampoules per box). This equates to a dose of 50 mg per ampoule. Testosterone isobutyrate (25 mg) is also available in combination with estradiol benzoate (2.5 mg) under the brand name Folivirin (1 mL ampoules).

== Side effects ==
Side effects of testosterone isobutyrate include virilization among others.

== Pharmacology ==
Testosterone isobutyrate is a prodrug of testosterone, and hence is an agonist of the androgen receptor, the biological target of endogenous androgens like testosterone and dihydrotestosterone. It produces both androgenic and anabolic effects, as well as weak estrogenic effects due to metabolism of testosterone into estradiol.

In contrast to most other testosterone esters, which are used as amorphous oil solutions, testosterone isobutyrate is provided in the form of a microcrystalline aqueous suspension. It has very low water solubility and forms a long-lasting microcrystalline depot within muscle upon intramuscular injection. This repository slowly dissolves over time. As a result, testosterone isobutyrate has a prolonged duration of action of approximately 2 weeks. It is administered at intervals of once every 1 to 2 weeks in men. Microcrystalline testosterone isobutyrate in aqueous suspension requires a larger needle (21 gauge) than oil solutions due to the presence of solid crystals in the suspension. It can produce local irritation, pain, and redness upon injection.

== Chemistry ==
Testosterone isobutyrate, or testosterone 17β-(2-methylpropanoate), is a synthetic androstane steroid and a derivative of testosterone. It is an androgen ester; specifically, it is the C17β 2-methylpropanoate (isobutyrate) ester of testosterone.

== History ==
Microcrystalline testosterone isobutyrate in aqueous suspension was first described in 1952. It was introduced for medical use shortly thereafter. Around the same time, testosterone enanthate in oil solution was introduced for medical use. It became the dominant long-acting injectable form of testosterone, and limited the commercial success of testosterone isobutyrate. The combination of microcrystalline estradiol benzoate and testosterone isobutyrate in aqueous suspension was introduced under the brand name Femandren M by 1953.

== Society and culture ==
=== Brand names ===
Brand names of testosterone isobutyrate include Agovirin-Depot, Perandren M, Testocryst, and Virex-Cryst. It has also been marketed in combination with estradiol benzoate under the brand names Femandren M and Folivirin.

=== Availability ===
Testosterone isobutyrate is available only in the Czech Republic and Slovakia. It was originally manufactured by the pharmaceutical company SPOFA intermittently manufactured by Biotika, and is now manufactured by BB Pharma.

== See also ==
- Estradiol benzoate/testosterone isobutyrate
