= C26H42O3 =

The molecular formula C_{26}H_{42}O_{3} (molar mass: 402.61 g/mol, exact mass: 402.3134 u) may refer to:

- Androstanolone enanthate (DHTH), also known as stanolone enanthate
- CP 55,244
