= C22H34O3 =

The molecular formula C_{22}H_{34}O_{3} (molar mass: 346.50 g/mol, exact mass: 346.2508 u) may refer to:

- Androstanolone propionate
- Ginkgoic acid
