= Nandrolone laurate =

Chemical compound

Clinical data
- Trade names: Clinibolin, Fortadex, Laurabolin
- Other names: Nandrolone dodecanoate; 9-Nortestosterone 17β-laurate
- Routes of administration: Intramuscular injection
- Drug class: Androgen; Anabolic steroid; Androgen ester; Progestogen

Identifiers
- IUPAC name: [(8R,9S,10R,13S,14S,17S)-13-methyl-3-oxo-2,6,7,8,9,10,11,12,14,15,16,17-dodecahydro-1H-cyclopenta[a]phenanthren-17-yl] dodecanoate
- CAS Number: 26490-31-3
- PubChem CID: 94371
- ChemSpider: 85167
- UNII: WVJ22FFN83
- CompTox Dashboard (EPA): DTXSID80949362
- ECHA InfoCard: 100.043.384

Chemical and physical data
- Formula: C_{30}H_{48}O_{3}
- Molar mass: 456.711 g·mol^{−1}
- 3D model (JSmol): Interactive image
- SMILES: CCCCCCCCCCCC(=O)O[C@H]1CC[C@@H]2[C@@]1(CC[C@H]3[C@H]2CCC4=CC(=O)CC[C@H]34)C
- InChI: InChI=1S/C30H48O3/c1-3-4-5-6-7-8-9-10-11-12-29(32)33-28-18-17-27-26-15-13-22-21-23(31)14-16-24(22)25(26)19-20-30(27,28)2/h21,24-28H,3-20H2,1-2H3/t24-,25+,26+,27-,28-,30-/m0/s1; Key:OXXNTXVXBWLYQE-PVHICTMWSA-N

Nandrolone laurate (BAN) (brand names Clinibolin, Fortadex, Laurabolin), or nandrolone dodecanoate, also known as 19-nortestosterone 17β-laurate, is a synthetic androgen and anabolic steroid and a nandrolone ester. It is used in veterinary medicine in Austria, France, the Netherlands, and Switzerland.

Relative affinities (%) of nandrolone and related steroids
Compound	PR	AR	ER	GR	MR	SHBG	CBG
Nandrolone	20	154–155	<0.1	0.5	1.6	1–16	0.1
Testosterone	1.0–1.2	100	<0.1	0.17	0.9	19–82	3–8
Estradiol	2.6	7.9	100	0.6	0.13	8.7–12	<0.1
Notes: Values are percentages (%). Reference ligands (100%) were progesterone for the PR, testosterone for the AR, estradiol for the ER, dexamethasone for the GR, aldosterone for the MR, dihydrotestosterone for SHBG, and cortisol for CBG. Sources: See template.

== See also ==
- List of androgen esters § Nandrolone esters
