= C27H40O3 =

The molecular formula C_{27}H_{40}O_{3} (molar mass: 412.60 g/mol) may refer to:

- Calcipotriol
- Nandrolone cyclohexylpropionate
- Testosterone cypionate
