= C21H34O3 =

The molecular formula C_{21}H_{34}O_{3} may refer to:

- Tetrahydrodeoxycorticosterone (5β-Pregnane-3α,21-diol-20-one)
- 5α-Pregnane-3α,17α-diol-20-one, also known as 17α-hydroxyallopregnanolone
