= Stenbolone acetate =

Chemical compound

Clinical data
- Trade names: Stenobolone, Anatrofin
- Other names: RS-2106; S-3760; 2-Methyl-4,5α-dihydro-δ^{1}-testosterone 17β-acetate; 2-Methyl-δ^{1}-DHT 17β-acetate; 2-Methyl-5α-androst-1-en-17β-ol-3-one 17β-acetate
- Routes of administration: Intramuscular injection
- Drug class: Androgen; Anabolic steroid; Androgen ester

Identifiers
- IUPAC name: [(5S,8R,9S,10S,13S,14S,17S)-2,10,13-trimethyl-3-oxo-4,5,6,7,8,9,11,12,14,15,16,17-dodecahydrocyclopenta[a]phenanthren-17-yl] acetate
- CAS Number: 1242-56-4
- PubChem CID: 10315500
- ChemSpider: 8490965
- UNII: 36HF75V9XI
- CompTox Dashboard (EPA): DTXSID40924751

Chemical and physical data
- Formula: C_{22}H_{32}O_{3}
- Molar mass: 344.495 g·mol^{−1}
- 3D model (JSmol): Interactive image
- SMILES: CC1=C[C@]2([C@@H](CC[C@@H]3[C@@H]2CC[C@]4([C@H]3CC[C@@H]4OC(=O)C)C)CC1=O)C
- InChI: InChI=1S/C22H32O3/c1-13-12-22(4)15(11-19(13)24)5-6-16-17-7-8-20(25-14(2)23)21(17,3)10-9-18(16)22/h12,15-18,20H,5-11H2,1-4H3/t15-,16-,17-,18-,20-,21-,22-/m0/s1; Key:FYTLCZSXKONUTF-OIELIUQCSA-N

Stenbolone acetate (USAN) (brand name Stenobolone, Anatrofin; former developmental code names RS-2106, S-3760), also known as 2-methyl-4,5α-dihydro-δ^{1}-testosterone 17β-acetate (2-methyl-δ^{1}-DHT 17β-acetate) or as 2-methyl-5α-androst-1-en-17β-ol-3-one 17β-acetate, is a synthetic, injected anabolic–androgenic steroid (AAS) and derivative of dihydrotestosterone (DHT) which has been marketed in Spain.

It is the C17β acetate ester of stenbolone, which is structurally related to 1-testosterone (Δ^{1}-DHT; dihydroboldenone) and to drostanolone (2α-methyl-DHT).

== See also ==
- List of androgen esters
