= C26H38O3 =

The molecular formula C_{26}H_{38}O_{3} (molar mass: 398.578 g/mol, exact mass: 398.2821 u) may refer to:

- Nandrolone cypionate
- Pentagestrone
- Testosterone hexahydrobenzoate
