= Nandrolone sulfate =

Synthetic androgen and anabolic steroid

Clinical data
- Trade names: Keratyl, Nandrol, Nandain, Colirio Ocul Nandrol
- Other names: 19-Nortestosterone 17β-sulfate
- Routes of administration: Ophthalmic (eye drops)
- Drug class: Androgen; Anabolic steroid; Androgen ester; Progestogen

Identifiers
- IUPAC name: [[(8R,9S,10R,13S,14S,17S)-13-methyl-3-oxo-2,6,7,8,9,10,11,12,14,15,16,17-dodecahydro-1H-cyclopenta[a]phenanthren-17-yl] hydrogen sulfate
- CAS Number: 98804-55-8 60672-82-4 (sodium)
- PubChem CID: 3085201
- DrugBank: DB14624
- ChemSpider: 23254851
- UNII: 2S202OX23O

Chemical and physical data
- Formula: C_{18}H_{26}O_{5}S
- Molar mass: 354.46 g·mol^{−1}
- 3D model (JSmol): Interactive image
- SMILES: C[C@]12CC[C@H]3[C@H]([C@@H]1CC[C@@H]2OS(=O)(=O)O)CCC4=CC(=O)CC[C@H]34
- InChI: InChI=1S/C18H26O5S/c1-18-9-8-14-13-5-3-12(19)10-11(13)2-4-15(14)16(18)6-7-17(18)23-24(20,21)22/h10,13-17H,2-9H2,1H3,(H,20,21,22)/t13-,14+,15+,16-,17-,18-/m0/s1; Key:SKZMVWBZTQNCKW-IZPLOLCNSA-N

Nandrolone sulfate, also known as 19-nortestosterone 17β-sulfate and used medically as the sodium salt nandrolone sodium sulfate (brand names Keratyl, Nandrol, Nandain, Colirio Ocul Nandrol), is a synthetic androgen and anabolic steroid and a nandrolone ester which is or has been used as an ophthalmic drug in the form of eye drops in Spain, Denmark, Switzerland, France, Portugal, and Belgium.

Relative affinities (%) of nandrolone and related steroids
Compound	PR	AR	ER	GR	MR	SHBG	CBG
Nandrolone	20	154–155	<0.1	0.5	1.6	1–16	0.1
Testosterone	1.0–1.2	100	<0.1	0.17	0.9	19–82	3–8
Estradiol	2.6	7.9	100	0.6	0.13	8.7–12	<0.1
Notes: Values are percentages (%). Reference ligands (100%) were progesterone for the PR, testosterone for the AR, estradiol for the ER, dexamethasone for the GR, aldosterone for the MR, dihydrotestosterone for SHBG, and cortisol for CBG. Sources: See template.

== See also ==
- List of androgen esters § Nandrolone esters
