= C24H38O3 =

The molecular formula C_{24}H_{38}O_{3} (molar mass: 374.557 g/mol) may refer to:

- Androstanolone valerate, or dihydrotestosterone pentanoate
- Canbisol
