= C26H34O3 =

The molecular formula C_{26}H_{34}O_{3} (molar mass: 394.546 g/mol) may refer to:

- Androstanolone benzoate
- Levonorgestrel cyclobutylcarboxylate
