= 5α-Pregnane-3α,17α-diol-20-one =

Names
- IUPAC name 3α,17-Dihydroxy-5α-pregnan-20-one
- Systematic IUPAC name 1-[(1R,3aS,3bR,5aS,7R,9aS,9bS,11aS)-1,7-Dihydroxy-9a,11a-dimethylhexadecahydro-1H-cyclopenta[a]phenanthren-1-yl]ethan-1-one
- Other names 5α-pregnan-3α,17α-diol-20-one, 5α-pregnane-3α,17α-diol-20-one, 3α,5α-3,17-dihydroxypregnan-20-one, 17-hydroxyallopregnanolone, 17-OH-allopregnanolone.

Identifiers
CAS Number	6890-65-9
3D model (JSmol)	Interactive image
ChEBI	CHEBI:194477
ChemSpider	99828
EC Number	229-994-6
PubChem CID	111243
CompTox Dashboard (EPA)	DTXSID701290974
- InChI: Key: LKQDFQLSEHWIRK-JRRMKBMNSA-N; InChI=1S/C21H34O3/c1-13(22)21(24)11-8-18-16-5-4-14-12-15(23)6-9-19(14,2)17(16)7-10-20(18,21)3/h14-18,23-24H,4-12H2,1-3H3/t14-,15+,16+,17-,18-,19-,20-,21-/m0/s1
- SMILES: CC(=O)[C@]1(CC[C@@H]2[C@@]1(CC[C@H]3[C@H]2CC[C@@H]4[C@@]3(CC[C@H](C4)O)C)C)O

Properties
Chemical formula	C_{21}H_{34}O_{3}
Molar mass	334.500 g·mol^{−1}
- Except where otherwise noted, data are given for materials in their standard state (at 25 °C [77 °F], 100 kPa). Infobox references

Comparison of chemical structures for allopregnane, allopregnanolone and 5α-Pregnane-3α,17α-diol-20-one (17α-allopregnanolone). Please note that the difference between the allopregnanolone and 5α-Pregnane-3α,17α-diol-20-one is a hydroxyl function group (−OH) at C17 position.

Structure of cholestane, a steroid with 27 carbon atoms. Its core ring system (ABCD), composed of 17 carbon atoms, is shown with IUPAC-approved ring lettering and atom numbering.

5α-Pregnane-3α,17α-diol-20-one, also known as 17α-hydroxyallopregnanolone (17-OH-allo) is an endogenous steroid.

== Function ==
5α-Pregnane-3α,17α-diol-20-one is a metabolite, an intermediate product within the androgen backdoor pathway in which 17α-hydroxyprogesterone (17-OHP) is 5α-reduced and finally converted to 5α-dihydrotestosterone (DHT) without testosterone as a metabolic intermediate.

The pathway can be outlined as 17-OHP → 5α-pregnan-17α-ol-3,20-dione → 5α-pregnane-3α,17α-diol-20-one → androsterone → 5α-androstane-3α,17β-diol → DHT.

== Biosynthesis ==
5α-Pregnane-3α,17α-diol-20-one is produced from 5α-pregnan-17α-ol-3,20-dione in a reaction catalyzed by a reductive 3α-hydroxysteroid dehydrogenase (3α-HSD), i.e. by the two aldo-keto reductase isozymes: AKR1C2 and AKR1C4, and by 17β-hydroxysteroid dehydrogenase 6 (HSD17B6) that also has the 3α-HSD activity.

== See also ==
- Androgen backdoor pathway
- Pregnane
- 5α-Pregnane
- Allopregnane
- Allopregnanolone
- 5α-Pregnan-17α-ol-3,20-dione
- 5α-Pregnane-3α,11β-diol-20-one
- 5α-Dihydrotestosterone
