= Stenbolone =

Chemical compound

Clinical data
- Other names: 2-Methyl-5α-androst-1-en-17β-ol-3-one; 2-Methyl-δ^{1}-4,5α-dihydrotestosterone; 2-Methyl-δ^{1}-DHT; Deacetylanatrofin
- Routes of administration: Intramuscular injection (as stenbolone acetate)
- Drug class: Androgen; Anabolic steroid

Identifiers
- IUPAC name: (5S,8R,9S,10S,13S,14S,17S)-17-Hydroxy-2,10,13-trimethyl-4,5,6,7,8,9,11,12,14,15,16,17-dodecahydrocyclopenta[a]phenanthren-3-one
- CAS Number: 5197-58-0
- PubChem CID: 234454
- ChemSpider: 204491
- UNII: 3Q6FKA848S
- ChEBI: CHEBI:34980
- CompTox Dashboard (EPA): DTXSID70199935

Chemical and physical data
- Formula: C_{20}H_{30}O_{2}
- Molar mass: 302.458 g·mol^{−1}
- 3D model (JSmol): Interactive image
- SMILES: CC1=C[C@]2([C@@H](CC[C@@H]3[C@@H]2CC[C@]4([C@H]3CC[C@@H]4O)C)CC1=O)C
- InChI: InChI=1S/C20H30O2/c1-12-11-20(3)13(10-17(12)21)4-5-14-15-6-7-18(22)19(15,2)9-8-16(14)20/h11,13-16,18,22H,4-10H2,1-3H3/t13-,14-,15-,16-,18-,19-,20-/m0/s1; Key:GYBGISLVORKLBN-YNZDMMAESA-N

Stenbolone is an anabolic–androgenic steroid (AAS) of the dihydrotestosterone (DHT) group which was never marketed. A C17β ester prodrug of stenbolone, stenbolone acetate, is used as an AAS for depot intramuscular injection under the brand names Anatrofin and Stenobolone.

== Chemistry ==
Stenbolone, also known as 2-methyl-δ^{1}-4,5α-dihydrotestosterone (2-methyl-δ^{1}-DHT) or as 2-methyl-5α-androst-1-en-17β-ol-3-one, is a synthetic androstane steroid and a derivative of DHT. It is closely related structurally to drostanolone (2-methyl-DHT), 1-testosterone (δ^{1}-DHT), and methylstenbolone (17α-methylstenbolone).

== Society and culture ==
=== Generic names ===
Stenbolone is the generic name of the drug and its INN.
