= Nandrolone cyclohexylpropionate =

Chemical compound

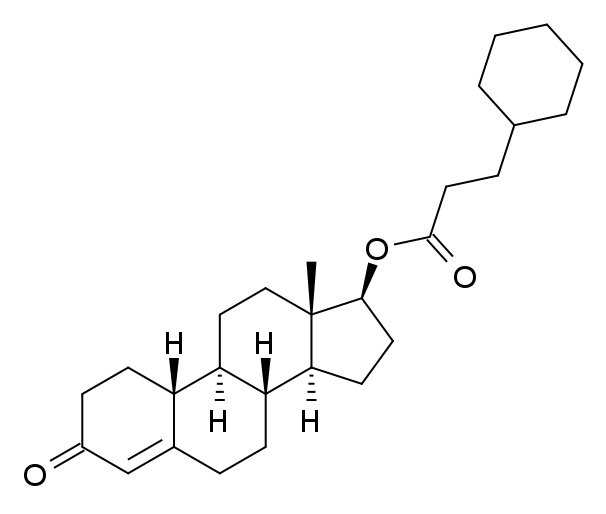

Clinical data
- Trade names: Andol, Fherbolico, Megabolin, Megabolin Retar, Pluropon, Proteron-Depot, Sanabolicum
- Other names: Nandrolone cyclohexanepropionate; 19-Nortestosterone 17β-(3-cyclohexyl)propionate; NTHCP
- Routes of administration: Intramuscular injection
- Drug class: Androgen; Anabolic steroid; Androgen ester; Progestogen

Identifiers
- IUPAC name: [(8R,9S,10R,13S,14S,17S)-13-methyl-3-oxo-2,6,7,8,9,10,11,12,14,15,16,17-dodecahydro-1H-cyclopenta[a]phenanthren-17-yl] 3-cyclohexylpropanoate
- CAS Number: 912-57-2
- PubChem CID: 101905
- ChemSpider: 92068
- UNII: K4NE48GG1Y
- CompTox Dashboard (EPA): DTXSID3057852
- ECHA InfoCard: 100.011.831

Chemical and physical data
- Formula: C_{27}H_{40}O_{3}
- Molar mass: 412.614 g·mol^{−1}
- 3D model (JSmol): Interactive image
- SMILES: C[C@]12CC[C@H]3[C@H]([C@@H]1CC[C@@H]2OC(=O)CCC4CCCCC4)CCC5=CC(=O)CC[C@H]35
- InChI: InChI=1S/C27H40O3/c1-27-16-15-22-21-11-9-20(28)17-19(21)8-10-23(22)24(27)12-13-25(27)30-26(29)14-7-18-5-3-2-4-6-18/h17-18,21-25H,2-16H2,1H3/t21-,22+,23+,24-,25-,27-/m0/s1; Key:TXLCJMHILCSZJG-QNTYDACNSA-N

Nandrolone cyclohexylpropionate (BAN, JAN) (brand names Andol, Fherbolico, Megabolin, Megabolin Retar, Pluropon, Proteron-Depot, Sanabolicum), or nandrolone cyclohexanepropionate, also known as 19-nortestosterone 17β-(3-cyclohexyl)propionate (NTHCP), is a synthetic androgen and anabolic steroid and a nandrolone ester that is or has been marketed in Spain, Austria, and Israel.

Relative affinities (%) of nandrolone and related steroids
| Compound | PR | AR | ER | GR | MR | SHBG | CBG |
|---|---|---|---|---|---|---|---|
| Nandrolone | 20 | 154–155 | <0.1 | 0.5 | 1.6 | 1–16 | 0.1 |
| Testosterone | 1.0–1.2 | 100 | <0.1 | 0.17 | 0.9 | 19–82 | 3–8 |
| Estradiol | 2.6 | 7.9 | 100 | 0.6 | 0.13 | 8.7–12 | <0.1 |
Notes: Values are percentages (%). Reference ligands (100%) were progesterone for the PR, testosterone for the AR, estradiol for the ER, dexamethasone for the GR, aldosterone for the MR, dihydrotestosterone for SHBG, and cortisol for CBG. Sources: See template.

== See also ==
- List of androgen esters § Nandrolone esters
