= Mepitiostane =

Chemical compound

Clinical data
- Trade names: Thioderon
- Other names: 10364-S; Epitiostanol 17β-(1-methoxy)cyclopentyl ether; 17β-[(1-Methoxycyclopentyl)oxy]-2α,3α-epithio-5α-androstane
- AHFS/Drugs.com: International Drug Names
- Routes of administration: By mouth
- Drug class: Androgen; Anabolic steroid; Androgen ether; Antiestrogen
- ATC code: None

Legal status
- Legal status: In general: ℞ (Prescription only)

Identifiers
- IUPAC name: (1S,2S,4R,8S,11R,12S,15S,16S)-15-[(1-methoxycyclopentyl)oxy]-2,16-dimethyl-5-thiapentacyclo[9.7.0.0^{2},^{8}.0^{4},^{6}.0^{12},^{16}]octadecane
- CAS Number: 21362-69-6
- PubChem CID: 9909202
- ChemSpider: 8084854
- UNII: O00404969K
- KEGG: D01602
- CompTox Dashboard (EPA): DTXSID001016882

Chemical and physical data
- Formula: C_{25}H_{40}O_{2}S
- Molar mass: 404.65 g·mol^{−1}
- 3D model (JSmol): Interactive image
- SMILES: C[C@]12CC[C@H]3[C@H]([C@@H]1CC[C@@H]2OC4(CCCC4)OC)CC[C@@H]5[C@@]3(C[C@@H]6[C@H](C5)S6)C
- InChI: InChI=1S/C25H40O2S/c1-23-13-10-19-17(7-6-16-14-20-21(28-20)15-24(16,19)2)18(23)8-9-22(23)27-25(26-3)11-4-5-12-25/h16-22H,4-15H2,1-3H3/t16-,17-,18-,19-,20-,21+,22-,23-,24-/m0/s1; Key:IVDYZAAPOLNZKG-KWHRADDSSA-N

Mepitiostane, sold under the brand name Thioderon, is an orally active antiestrogen and anabolic–androgenic steroid (AAS) of the dihydrotestosterone (DHT) group which is marketed in Japan as an antineoplastic agent for the treatment of breast cancer. It is a prodrug of epitiostanol. The drug was patented and described in 1968.

== Medical uses ==
Mepitiostane is used as an antiestrogen and antineoplastic agent in the treatment of breast cancer. It is also used as an AAS in the treatment of anemia of renal failure. A series of case reports have found it to be effective in the treatment of an estrogen receptor (ER)-dependent meningiomas as well.

== Side effects ==
Mepitiostane shows a high rate of virilizing side effects such as acne, hirsutism, and voice changes in women.

== Pharmacology ==
=== Pharmacodynamics ===
Mepitiostane is described as similar to tamoxifen as an antiestrogen, and through its active form epitiostanol, binds directly to and antagonizes the ER. It is also an AAS.

=== Pharmacokinetics ===
Mepitiostane is converted into epitiostanol in the body.

== Chemistry ==
Mepitiostane, also known as epitiostanol 17β-(1-methoxy)cyclopentyl ether, is a synthetic androstane steroid and a derivative of DHT. It is the C17β (1-methoxy)cyclopentyl ether of epitiostanol, which itself is 2α,3α-epithio-DHT or 2α,3α-epithio-5α-androstan-17β-ol. A related AAS is methylepitiostanol (17α-methylepitiostanol), which is an orally active variant of epitiostanol similarly to mepitiostane, though also has a risk of hepatotoxicity.

== Society and culture ==
=== Generic names ===
Mepitiostane is the generic name of the drug and its INN and JAN.
