= 5α-Pregnan-17α-ol-3,20-dione =

Names
- IUPAC name 17α-Hydroxy-5α-pregnane-3,20-dione
- Systematic IUPAC name (1R,3aS,3bR,5aS,9aS,9bS,11aS)-1-Acetyl-1-hydroxy-9a,11a-dimethylhexadecahydro-7H-cyclopenta[a]phenanthren-7-one
- Other names 5α-17-Hydroxypregnane-3,20-dione, 17-OH-DHP, 5α-Pregnane-17α-ol-3,20-dione, 17-Hydroxydihydroprogesterone, 17α-hydroxy-dihydroprogesterone

Identifiers
CAS Number	570-59-2
3D model (JSmol)	Interactive image
ChEMBL	ChEMBL1078989
ChemSpider	10063888
KEGG	C22831
PubChem CID	11889565
CompTox Dashboard (EPA)	DTXSID30474538
- InChI: Key: UUOHXXXJRQGPLC-JJFNZWTKSA-N; InChI=1S/C21H32O3/c1-13(22)21(24)11-8-18-16-5-4-14-12-15(23)6-9-19(14,2)17(16)7-10-20(18,21)3/h14,16-18,24H,4-12H2,1-3H3/t14-,16+,17-,18-,19-,20-,21-/m0/s1
- SMILES: CC(=O)[C@]1(CC[C@@H]2[C@@]1(CC[C@H]3[C@H]2CC[C@@H]4[C@@]3(CCC(=O)C4)C)C)O

Properties
Chemical formula	C_{21}H_{32}O_{3}
Molar mass	332.484 g·mol^{−1}
- Except where otherwise noted, data are given for materials in their standard state (at 25 °C [77 °F], 100 kPa). Infobox references

5α-Pregnan-17α-ol-3,20-dione, also known as 17α-hydroxy-dihydroprogesterone (17-OH-DHP) is an endogenous steroid, a metabolite of 17α-hydroxyprogesterone.

== Function ==
The androgen backdoor pathway (red arrows) roundabout testosterone embedded in within conventional androgen synthesis that lead to 5α-dihydrotestosterone through testosterone.

5α-Pregnan-17α-ol-3,20-dione (17-OH-DHP) is a progestogen, i.e., it binds to the progesterone receptors. However, 17-OH-DHP is better studied as a metabolic intermediate than a progestogen per se.

17-OH-DHP is the first intermediate product within the androgen backdoor pathway in which 17α-hydroxyprogesterone (17-OHP) is 5α-reduced and finally converted to 5α-dihydrotestosterone (DHT) without testosterone intermediate. The subsequent intermediate products in the pathway are 5α-pregnane-3α,17α-diol-20-one, androsterone and 5α-androstane-3α,17β-diol. The primary feature of the androgen backdoor pathway is that 17α-hydroxyprogesterone (17-OHP) can be 5α-reduced and finally converted to 5α-dihydrotestosterone (DHT) via an alternative route that bypasses the conventional intermediates androstenedione and testosterone.

== Biosynthesis ==
5α-Pregnan-17α-ol-3,20-dione is produced by 5α-reduction of 17-OHP. The reaction is catalyzed by SRD5A1 and possibly, SRD5A2 enzymes. While the role of the SRD5A1 enzyme in this reaction is well established, it is unclear whether SRD5A2 is also involved. Some authors claim that the reduction of 17-OHP to 17OHDHP by SRD5A1 is not "sufficient" or "efficient", as supported by measurements of rat SRD5A2 activity in a 1971 study. In a later study, conducted in 2017, however, it has been shown that recombinant human SRD5A1 and SRD5A2 can catalyze the reduction of 17-OHP at comparable rates to the reduction of progesterone. Given both isozymes may be expressed in fetal tissues of both sexes, the action of SRD5A2 in this reaction in humans is yet to be established.

== See also ==
- Androgen backdoor pathway
- 5α-Dihydrotestosterone
