= Nandrolone cypionate =

Chemical compound

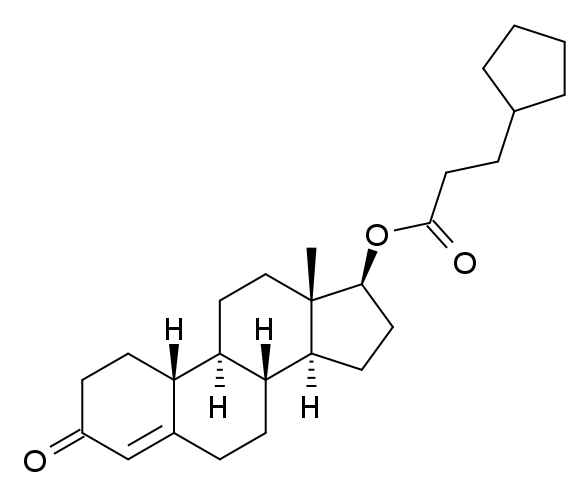

Clinical data
- Trade names: Anabo, Depo-Nortestonate, Dynabol, Nortestrionate, Pluropon, Sterocrinolo
- Other names: Nandrolone cipionate; 19-Nortestosterone cypionate; 19-Nortestosterone 17β-cyclopentanepropionate
- Routes of administration: Intramuscular injection
- Drug class: Androgen; Anabolic steroid; Androgen ester; Progestogen

Identifiers
- IUPAC name: [(8R,9S,10R,13S,14S,17S)-13-methyl-3-oxo-2,6,7,8,9,10,11,12,14,15,16,17-dodecahydro-1H-cyclopenta[a]phenanthren-17-yl] 3-cyclopentylpropanoate
- CAS Number: 601-63-8
- PubChem CID: 237252
- ChemSpider: 207143
- UNII: M21W049AQY
- ChEBI: CHEBI:34184
- CompTox Dashboard (EPA): DTXSID80975525
- ECHA InfoCard: 100.009.097

Chemical and physical data
- Formula: C_{26}H_{38}O_{3}
- Molar mass: 398.587 g·mol^{−1}
- 3D model (JSmol): Interactive image
- SMILES: C[C@]12CC[C@H]3[C@H]([C@@H]1CC[C@@H]2OC(=O)CCC4CCCC4)CCC5=CC(=O)CC[C@H]35
- InChI: InChI=1S/C26H38O3/c1-26-15-14-21-20-10-8-19(27)16-18(20)7-9-22(21)23(26)11-12-24(26)29-25(28)13-6-17-4-2-3-5-17/h16-17,20-24H,2-15H2,1H3/t20-,21+,22+,23-,24-,26-/m0/s1; Key:REWKEGSQGOSEES-FNKXXKKYSA-N

Nandrolone cypionate (brand names Anabo, Depo-Nortestonate, Dynabol, Nortestrionate, Pluropon, Sterocrinolo), or nandrolone cipionate, also known as 19-nortestosterone 17β-cyclopentanepropionate, is a synthetic androgen and anabolic steroid and a nandrolone ester.

Relative affinities (%) of nandrolone and related steroids
Compound	PR	AR	ER	GR	MR	SHBG	CBG
Nandrolone	20	154–155	<0.1	0.5	1.6	1–16	0.1
Testosterone	1.0–1.2	100	<0.1	0.17	0.9	19–82	3–8
Estradiol	2.6	7.9	100	0.6	0.13	8.7–12	<0.1
Notes: Values are percentages (%). Reference ligands (100%) were progesterone for the PR, testosterone for the AR, estradiol for the ER, dexamethasone for the GR, aldosterone for the MR, dihydrotestosterone for SHBG, and cortisol for CBG. Sources: See template.

== See also ==
- List of androgen esters § Nandrolone esters
