= Epitiostanol =

Chemical compound

Clinical data
- Trade names: Thiodrol
- Other names: Epithiostanol; Epithioandrostanol; 10275-S; 2α,3α-Epithio-5α-androstan-17β-ol; 2α,3α-Epithio-4,5α-dihydrotestosterone; 2α,3α-Epithio-DHT
- Routes of administration: Intramuscular injection
- Drug class: Androgen; Anabolic steroid; Antiestrogen

Identifiers
- IUPAC name: (1S,3AS,3bR,5aS,6aS,7aR,8aS,8bS,10aS)-8a,10a-dimethylhexadecahydro-1H-cyclopenta[7,8]phenanthro[2,3-b]thiiren-1-ol
- CAS Number: 2363-58-8
- PubChem CID: 3243
- ChemSpider: 391989
- UNII: YE7586973L
- CompTox Dashboard (EPA): DTXSID2045367

Chemical and physical data
- Formula: C_{19}H_{30}OS
- Molar mass: 306.51 g·mol^{−1}
- 3D model (JSmol): Interactive image
- SMILES: CC12CCC3C(C1CCC2O)CCC4C3(CC5C(C4)S5)C
- InChI: InChI=1S/C19H30OS/c1-18-8-7-14-12(13(18)5-6-17(18)20)4-3-11-9-15-16(21-15)10-19(11,14)2/h11-17,20H,3-10H2,1-2H3; Key:OBMLHUPNRURLOK-UHFFFAOYSA-N

Epitiostanol, sold under the brand name Thiodrol, is an injected antiestrogen and anabolic–androgenic steroid (AAS) of the dihydrotestosterone (DHT) group which was described in the literature in 1965 and has been marketed in Japan as an antineoplastic agent for the treatment of breast cancer since 1977.

== Medical uses ==
Epitiostanol is used as an antiestrogen and antineoplastic agent in the treatment of breast cancer. It has also been found to be effective in the treatment of gynecomastia.

== Side effects ==
A prodrug of epitiostanol, mepitiostane, which is also marketed for the treatment of breast cancer, is reported to show a high rate of virilizing side effects such as acne, hirsutism, and voice changes in women.

== Pharmacology ==
=== Pharmacodynamics ===
Epitiostanol binds directly to the androgen receptor (AR) and estrogen receptor (ER), where it acts as an agonist and antagonist, respectively. It is described as potent in its activity as an antiestrogen and comparatively weak as an AAS. In any case, in terms of AAS potency, epitiostanol has been found to have 11 times the anabolic activity and approximately equal androgenic activity relative to that of the reference AAS methyltestosterone. The mechanism of action of epitiostanol in breast cancer is multimodal; it directly suppresses tumor growth through activation of the AR and inhibition of the ER, and, in premenopausal women, it additionally acts as an antigonadotropin and reducing systemic estrogen levels via AR activation and consequent suppression of the hypothalamic-pituitary-gonadal axis. Epitiostanol is unique among AAS in acting as an antagonist of the ER.

=== Pharmacokinetics ===
Similarly to the case of testosterone, epitiostanol shows poor bioavailability and weak therapeutic efficacy when taken orally due to extensive first-pass metabolism. As such, it must instead be administered via intramuscular injection.

== Chemistry ==
Epitiostanol, also known as 2α,3α-epithio-4,5α-dihydrotestosterone (2α,3α-epithio-DHT) or as 2α,3α-epithio-5α-androstan-17β-ol, is a synthetic androstane steroid and a derivative of DHT. Mepitiostane, a derivative of epitiostanol with a C17α methoxycyclopentane ether substitution, is an orally active prodrug of epitiostanol. Another derivative, methylepitiostanol (2α,3α-epithio-17α-methyl-5α-androstan-17β-ol), has a methyl group at the C17α position and is similarly an orally active variant of epitiostanol; it has surfaced as a novel designer steroid.

== Society and culture ==
=== Generic names ===
Epitiostanol is the generic name of the drug and its INN and JAN.
