= Methylepitiostanol =

Chemical compound

Clinical data
- Other names: Epistane; Hemapolin; Havoc; Epi Plex; Methylepithiostanol; Methepitiostane; 17α-Methylepitiostanol; 2α,3α-Epithio-17α-methyl-4,5α-dihydrotestosterone; 2α,3α-Epithio-17α-methyl-DHT
- Routes of administration: By mouth
- Drug class: Androgen; Anabolic steroid; Antiestrogen
- ATC code: None

Legal status
- Legal status: US: Schedule III

Identifiers
- IUPAC name: (1S,2S,4R,6S,8S,11R,12S,15S,16S)-2,15,16-Trimethyl-5-thiapentacyclo[9.7.0.0^{2},^{8}.0^{4},^{6}.0^{12},^{16}]octadecan-15-ol
- CAS Number: 4267-80-5
- PubChem CID: 71752521
- ChemSpider: 48063843
- UNII: Z50OE1022B

Chemical and physical data
- Formula: C_{20}H_{32}OS
- Molar mass: 320.54 g·mol^{−1}
- 3D model (JSmol): Interactive image
- SMILES: CC12CCC3C(C1CCC2(C)O)CCC4C3(CC5C(C4)S5)C
- InChI: InChI=1S/C20H32OS/c1-18-11-17-16(22-17)10-12(18)4-5-13-14(18)6-8-19(2)15(13)7-9-20(19,3)21/h12-17,21H,4-11H2,1-3H3/t12-,13+,14-,15-,16-,17+,18-,19-,20-/m0/s1; Key:UPLPHRJJTCUQAY-WIRWPRASSA-N

Methylepitiostanol, known by the nicknames Epistane, Hemapolin, Havoc, and Epi Plex, is a synthetic and orally active anabolic–androgenic steroid (AAS) of the dihydrotestosterone (DHT) group which was first described in the literature in 1974 but was never marketed for medical use. It is the 17α-methylated derivative of epitiostanol, an AAS and antiestrogen which was formerly used in the treatment of breast cancer in Japan. Similarly to mepitiostane, methylepitiostanol is an orally active variant of epitiostanol. Due to its C17α methyl group, the drug is considered to have a high potential for hepatotoxicity.

Methylepitiostanol surfaced on the internet as a novel designer steroid in dietary supplements around 2009. It was identified in 2015 in over 30 products sold online that listed it as an ingredient on their product label.

It became a controlled substance in the United States in 2014 with the passage of the Designer Anabolic Steroid Control Act, which explicitly listed it among 27 new steroids as controlled by the Act.

== Chemistry ==
Methylepitiostanol, also known as 2α,3α-epithio-17α-methyl-4,5α-dihydrotestosterone (2α,3α-epithio-17α-methyl-DHT) or as 2α,3α-epithio-17α-methyl-5α-androstan-17β-ol, is a synthetic androstane steroid and a 17α-alkylated derivative of DHT. It is closely related to epitiostanol (2α,3α-epithio-DHT) and mepitiostane (epitiostanol 17-methyloxycyclopentyl ether).
