= 5α-Pregnane-3α,11β-diol-20-one =

Identifiers
CAS Number	565-89-9
3D model (JSmol)	Interactive image
ChEMBL	ChEMBL2322582
ChemSpider	8301368
PubChem CID	10125849
CompTox Dashboard (EPA)	DTXSID301275594
- InChI: InChI=1S/C21H34O3/c1-12(22)16-6-7-17-15-5-4-13-10-14(23)8-9-20(13,2)19(15)18(24)11-21(16,17)3/h13-19,23-24H,4-11H2,1-3H3/t13-,14+,15-,16+,17-,18-,19+,20-,21+/m0/s1 Key: NFVCQZNBRFPYOP-DAVHWALQSA-N
- SMILES: CC(=O)C1CCC2C1(CC(C3C2CCC4C3(CCC(C4)O)C)O)C

Properties
Chemical formula	C_{21}H_{34}O_{3}
Molar mass	334.500 g·mol^{−1}
- Except where otherwise noted, data are given for materials in their standard state (at 25 °C [77 °F], 100 kPa). Infobox references

5α-Pregnane-3α,11β-diol-20-one, abbreviated as 3,11diOH-DHP4, also known as 3α,11β-dihydroxy-5α-pregnan-20-one, is an endogenous steroid.

The steroid 5α-pregnan-3α,11β-diol-20-one (3,11diOH-DHP4) plays a role in the 11-oxygenated steroid backdoor pathway to androgens as a metabolic intermediate. This pathway involves the metabolism of C_{21} steroids (pregnanes) via enzymes such as steroid 11β-hydroxylase (CYP11B1), steroid 5α-reductase (SRD5A1), 17α-hydroxylase/17,20-lyase (CYP17A1), resulting in the production of androgen precursors. Docking studies have shown that the C11-oxy group of 3,11diOH-DHP4 and alfaxalone does not significantly affect their binding to CYP17A1. Furthermore, it has been observed that the lyase activity of CYP17A1 is impaired by the C11-hydroxyl (-OH) and keto- (=O) moieties present in these steroids. The lyase activity of CYP17A1 converts intermediates like 3,11diOH-DHP4 to potent androgens such as 5α-pregnan-3α,11β,17α-triol-20-one (11OH-Pdiol). These findings indicate that CYP17A1 plays a role in the metabolism of this steroid through both hydroxylation and lyase reactions in the 11-oxygenated steroid backdoor pathway to androgens. This pathway is important for regulating adrenal and gonadal steroid hormone biosynthesis and can contribute to elevated levels of androgens in certain conditions.
