= Androstanolone enanthate =

Synthetic androgen and anabolic steroid

Clinical data
- Trade names: Anaboleen Depot
- Other names: Stanolone enanthate; Dihydrotestosterone enanthate; DHT enanthate; Dihydrotestosterone heptanoate; DHTH; 5α-Androstan-17β-ol-3-one 17β-heptanoate
- Routes of administration: Intramuscular injection
- Drug class: Androgen; Anabolic steroid; Androgen ester

Identifiers
- IUPAC name: [(5S,8R,9S,10S,13S,14S,17S)-10,13-dimethyl-3-oxo-1,2,4,5,6,7,8,9,11,12,14,15,16,17-tetradecahydrocyclopenta[a]phenanthren-17-yl] heptanoate
- CAS Number: 33776-88-4
- PubChem CID: 160230
- ChemSpider: 140831
- UNII: UAQ3N36A25
- CompTox Dashboard (EPA): DTXSID90955358

Chemical and physical data
- Formula: C_{26}H_{42}O_{3}
- Molar mass: 402.619 g·mol^{−1}
- 3D model (JSmol): Interactive image
- SMILES: CCCCCCC(=O)O[C@H]1CC[C@@H]2[C@@]1(CC[C@H]3[C@H]2CC[C@@H]4[C@@]3(CCC(=O)C4)C)C
- InChI: InChI=1S/C26H42O3/c1-4-5-6-7-8-24(28)29-23-12-11-21-20-10-9-18-17-19(27)13-15-25(18,2)22(20)14-16-26(21,23)3/h18,20-23H,4-17H2,1-3H3/t18-,20-,21-,22-,23-,25-,26-/m0/s1; Key:DDYHAKNCTGGYOK-LVYWIKMTSA-N

Androstanolone enanthate (brand name Anaboleen Depot), also known as stanolone enanthate or dihydrotestosterone heptanoate (DHTH), as well as 5α-androstan-17β-ol-3-one 17β-heptanoate, is a synthetic androgen and anabolic steroid and a dihydrotestosterone ester. It is used as an injectable and acts as a prodrug of androstanolone (stanolone, dihydrotestosterone, DHT). The drug has been studied in and found to be effective in the treatment of gynecomastia in boys and adult men. The pharmacology of androstanolone enanthate has been studied.

== See also ==
- List of androgen esters § Dihydrotestosterone esters
