= Androstanolone benzoate =

Chemical compound

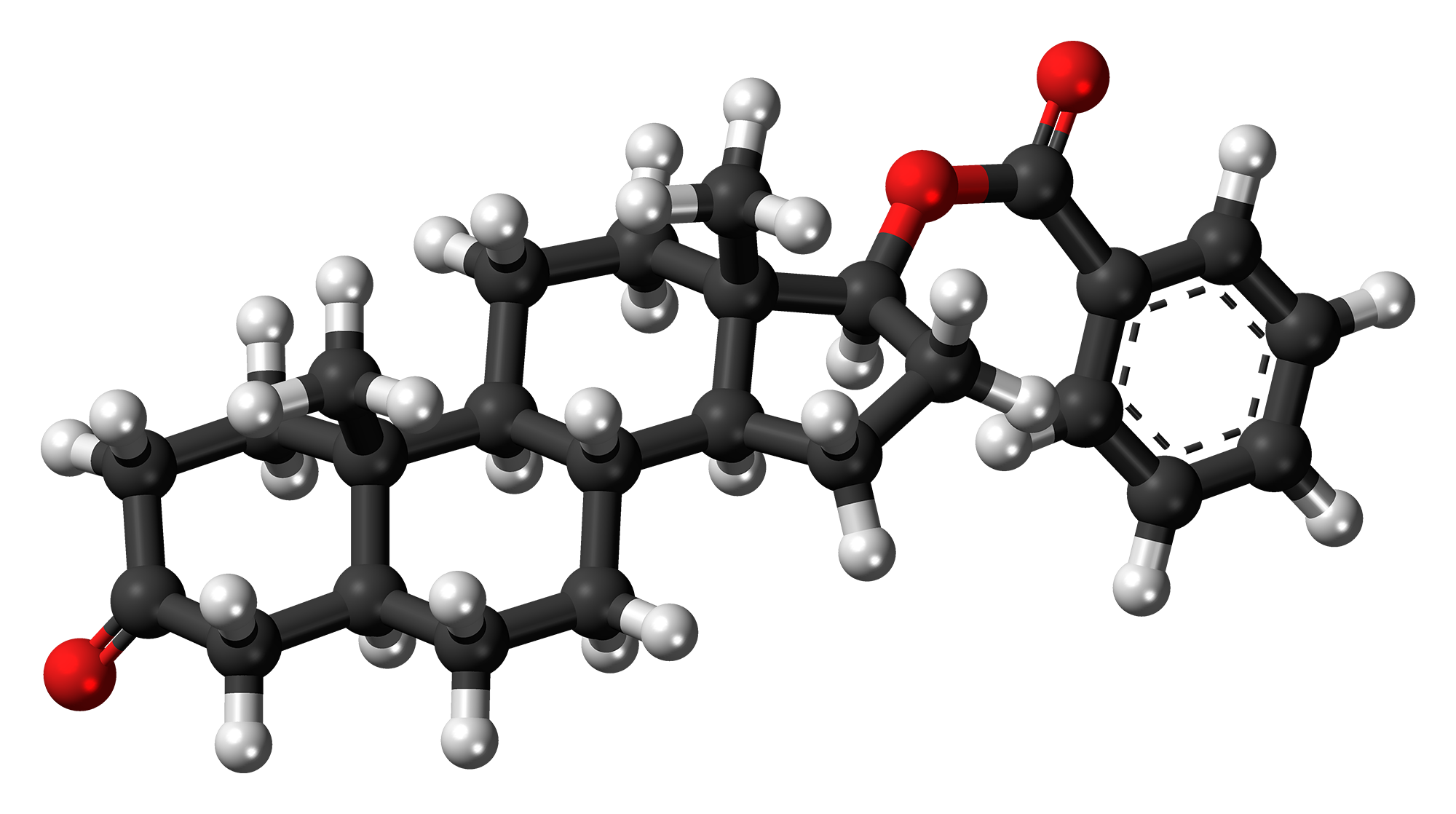

Clinical data
- Trade names: Ermalone-Amp, Hermalone, Sarcosan
- Other names: Stanolone benzoate; Dihydrotestosterone benzoate; DHT benzoate; DHTB; 5α-Androstan-17β-ol-3-one 17β-benzoate
- Routes of administration: Intramuscular injection
- Drug class: Androgen; Anabolic steroid; Androgen ester

Identifiers
- IUPAC name: [(5S,8R,9S,10S,13S,14S,17S)-10,13-dimethyl-3-oxo-1,2,4,5,6,7,8,9,11,12,14,15,16,17-tetradecahydrocyclopenta[a]phenanthren-17-yl] benzoate
- CAS Number: 1057-07-4
- PubChem CID: 13987
- ChemSpider: 13379
- UNII: T74307G2D9
- KEGG: C14259
- ChEBI: CHEBI:34979
- CompTox Dashboard (EPA): DTXSID0036502
- ECHA InfoCard: 100.012.629

Chemical and physical data
- Formula: C_{26}H_{34}O_{3}
- Molar mass: 394.555 g·mol^{−1}
- 3D model (JSmol): Interactive image
- SMILES: C[C@]12CCC(=O)C[C@@H]1CC[C@@H]3[C@@H]2CC[C@]4([C@H]3CC[C@@H]4OC(=O)C5=CC=CC=C5)C
- InChI: InChI=1S/C26H34O3/c1-25-14-12-19(27)16-18(25)8-9-20-21-10-11-23(26(21,2)15-13-22(20)25)29-24(28)17-6-4-3-5-7-17/h3-7,18,20-23H,8-16H2,1-2H3/t18-,20-,21-,22-,23-,25-,26-/m0/s1; Key:ZGDZDAPCWHIIKB-LVYWIKMTSA-N

Androstanolone benzoate (brand names Ermalone-Amp, Hermalone, Sarcosan), also known as stanolone benzoate or dihydrotestosterone benzoate (DHTB), as well as 5α-androstan-17β-ol-3-one 17β-benzoate, is a synthetic androgen and anabolic steroid and a dihydrotestosterone ester. It is used as an injectable and acts as a prodrug of androstanolone (stanolone, dihydrotestosterone, DHT).

== See also ==
- List of androgen esters § Dihydrotestosterone esters
