= Androstanolone valerate =

Synthetic drug

Clinical data
- Trade names: Apeton
- Other names: Stanolone valerate; Dihydrotestosterone valerate; DHT valerate; Dihydrotestosterone pentanoate; DHT pentanoate; 5α-Androstan-17β-3-one 17β-valerate
- Routes of administration: Intramuscular injection
- Drug class: Androgen; Anabolic steroid; Androgen ester

Identifiers
- IUPAC name: [(5S,8R,9S,10S,13S,14S,17S)-10,13-dimethyl-3-oxo-1,2,4,5,6,7,8,9,11,12,14,15,16,17-tetradecahydrocyclopenta[a]phenanthren-17-yl] pentanoate
- CAS Number: 26271-72-7
- ChemSpider: 21476746
- UNII: B43U3P3X26
- CompTox Dashboard (EPA): DTXSID301043266

Chemical and physical data
- Formula: C_{24}H_{38}O_{3}
- Molar mass: 374.565 g·mol^{−1}
- 3D model (JSmol): Interactive image
- SMILES: CCCCC(=O)O[C@H]1CC[C@@H]2[C@@]1(CC[C@H]3[C@H]2CC[C@@H]4[C@@]3(CCC(=O)C4)C)C
- InChI: InChI=1S/C24H38O3/c1-4-5-6-22(26)27-21-10-9-19-18-8-7-16-15-17(25)11-13-23(16,2)20(18)12-14-24(19,21)3/h16,18-21H,4-15H2,1-3H3/t16-,18-,19-,20-,21-,23-,24-/m0/s1; Key:AGXPLMCKHGTYNP-KXBDTHCRSA-N

Androstanolone valerate (brand name Apeton), also known as stanolone valerate or dihydrotestosterone pentanoate, as well as 5α-androstan-17β-3-one 17β-valerate, is a synthetic androgen and anabolic steroid and a dihydrotestosterone ester. It is used as an injectable and acts as a prodrug of androstanolone (stanolone, dihydrotestosterone, DHT).

== See also ==
- List of androgen esters § Dihydrotestosterone esters
