= Androstanolone propionate =

Synthetic androgen and anabolic steroid

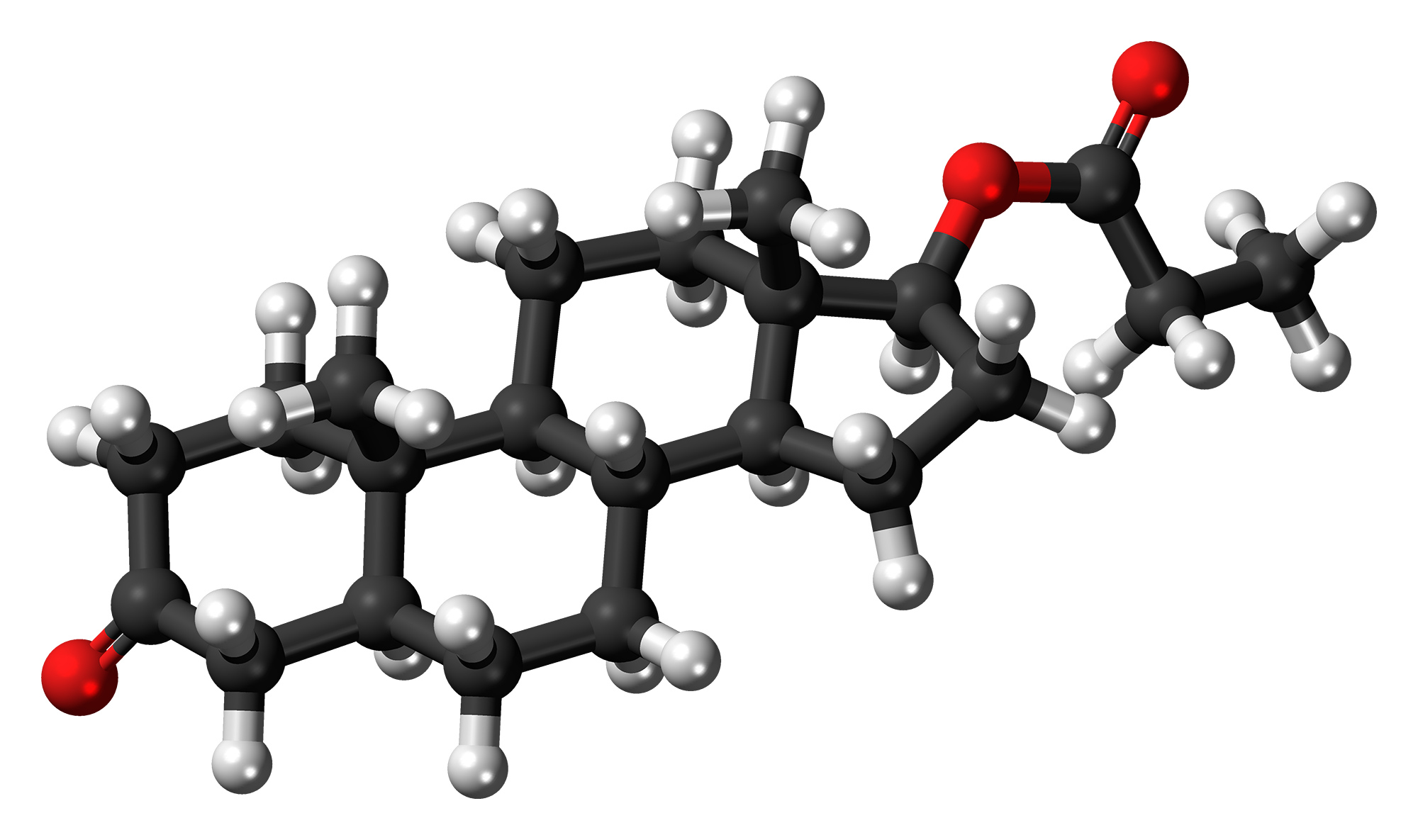

Clinical data
- Trade names: Pesomax
- Other names: Stanolone propionate; Dihydrotestosterone propionate; DHT propionate; DHTP; 5α-Androstan-17β-ol-3-one 17β-propionate
- Routes of administration: Intramuscular injection
- Drug class: Androgen; Anabolic steroid; Androgen ester

Identifiers
- IUPAC name: [(5S,8R,9S,10S,13S,14S,17S)-10,13-dimethyl-3-oxo-1,2,4,5,6,7,8,9,11,12,14,15,16,17-tetradecahydrocyclopenta[a]phenanthren-17-yl] propanoate
- CAS Number: 855-22-1
- PubChem CID: 13328
- ChemSpider: 12763
- UNII: F06YUT08U8
- CompTox Dashboard (EPA): DTXSID801006059

Chemical and physical data
- Formula: C_{22}H_{34}O_{3}
- Molar mass: 346.511 g·mol^{−1}
- 3D model (JSmol): Interactive image
- SMILES: CCC(=O)O[C@H]1CC[C@@H]2[C@@]1(CC[C@H]3[C@H]2CC[C@@H]4[C@@]3(CCC(=O)C4)C)C
- InChI: InChI=1S/C22H34O3/c1-4-20(24)25-19-8-7-17-16-6-5-14-13-15(23)9-11-21(14,2)18(16)10-12-22(17,19)3/h14,16-19H,4-13H2,1-3H3/t14-,16-,17-,18-,19-,21-,22-/m0/s1; Key:XTAARPJDFFXHGH-GRPBBMKTSA-N

Androstanolone propionate (brand name Pesomax), also known as stanolone propionate or dihydrotestosterone propionate (DHTP), as well as 5α-androstan-17β-ol-3-one 17β-propionate, is a synthetic androgen and anabolic steroid and a dihydrotestosterone ester that is marketed in Italy. It is used as an injectable and acts as a prodrug of androstanolone (stanolone, dihydrotestosterone, DHT).

== See also ==
- List of androgen esters § Dihydrotestosterone esters
