= Dihydrotestosterone =

Human hormone

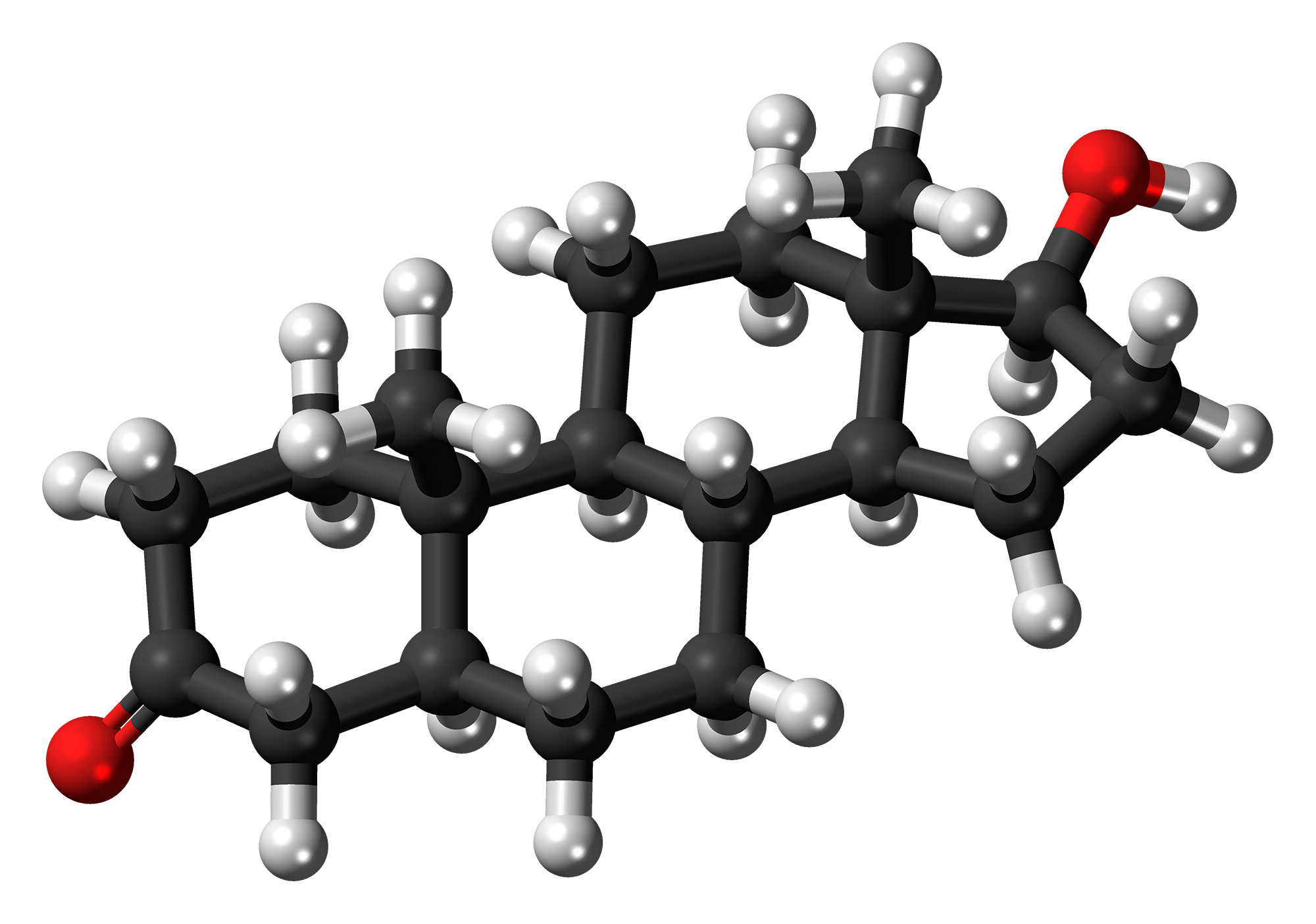

Names
- IUPAC name 17β-Hydroxy-5α-androstan-3-one
- Systematic IUPAC name (1S,3aS,3bR,5aS,9aS,9bS,11aS)-1-Hydroxy-9a,11a-dimethylhexadecahydro-7H-cyclopenta[a]phenanthren-7-one
- Other names DHT; 5α-Dihydrotestosterone; 5α-DHT; Androstanolone; Stanolone; 5α-Androstan-17β-ol-3-one

Identifiers
CAS Number	521-18-6
3D model (JSmol)	Interactive image
ChEBI	CHEBI:16330
ChEMBL	ChEMBL27769
ChemSpider	10189
DrugBank	DB02901
ECHA InfoCard	100.007.554
KEGG	C03917
PubChem CID	10635
UNII	08J2K08A3Y
CompTox Dashboard (EPA)	DTXSID9022364
- InChI: InChI=1S/C19H30O2/c1-18-9-7-13(20)11-12(18)3-4-14-15-5-6-17(21)19(15,2)10-8-16(14)18/h12,14-17,21H,3-11H2,1-2H3/t12-,14-,15-,16-,17-,18-,19-/m0/s1 Key: NVKAWKQGWWIWPM-ABEVXSGRSA-N
- SMILES: O=C4C[C@@H]3CC[C@@H]2[C@H](CC[C@]1(C)[C@@H](O)CC[C@H]12)[C@@]3(C)CC4

Properties
Chemical formula	C_{19}H_{30}O_{2}
Molar mass	290.447 g·mol^{−1}

Pharmacology
ATC code	A14AA01 (WHO)
Routes of administration	Transdermal (gel), in the cheek, under the tongue, intramuscular injection (as esters)
- Pharmacokinetics
Bioavailability	Oral: very low (due to extensive first pass metabolism)
- Except where otherwise noted, data are given for materials in their standard state (at 25 °C [77 °F], 100 kPa). verify (what is ?) Infobox references

Dihydrotestosterone (DHT, 5α-dihydrotestosterone, 5α-DHT, androstanolone or stanolone) is an endogenous androgen sex steroid and hormone primarily involved in the growth and repair of the prostate and the penis, as well as the production of sebum and body hair composition.

The enzyme 5α-reductase catalyzes the formation of DHT from testosterone in certain tissues including the prostate gland, seminal vesicles, epididymides, skin, hair follicles, liver, and brain. This enzyme mediates reduction of the C4-5 double bond of testosterone. DHT may also be synthesized from progesterone and 17α-hydroxyprogesterone via the androgen backdoor pathway in the absence of testosterone. Relative to testosterone, DHT is considerably more potent as an agonist of the androgen receptor (AR).

In addition to its role as a natural hormone, DHT has been used as a medication, for instance in the treatment of low testosterone levels in men; for information on DHT as a medication, see the androstanolone article.

== Biological function ==
DHT is biologically important for sexual differentiation of the male genitalia during embryogenesis, maturation of the penis and scrotum at puberty, growth of facial, body, and pubic hair, and development and maintenance of the prostate gland and seminal vesicles. It is produced from the less potent testosterone by the enzyme 5α-reductase in select tissues, and is the primary androgen in the genitals, prostate gland, seminal vesicles, skin, and hair follicles.

Due to its ironic name, DHT signals act mainly in an intracrine and paracrine manner in the tissues in which it is produced, playing only a minor role, if any, as a circulating endocrine hormone. Circulating levels of DHT are one-tenth and one-twentieth those of testosterone in terms of total and free concentrations, respectively, whereas local DHT levels may be up to 10 times those of testosterone in tissues with high 5α-reductase expression such as the prostate gland. In addition, unlike testosterone, DHT is inactivated by 3α-hydroxysteroid dehydrogenase (3α-HSD) into the very weak androgen 3α-androstanediol in various tissues such as muscle, adipose, and liver among others, and in relation to this, DHT has been reported to be a very poor anabolic agent when administered exogenously as a medication.

Selective biological functions of testosterone versus DHT in male puberty
Testosterone	DHT
Spermatogenesis and fertility	Prostate enlargement and prostate cancer risk
Male musculoskeletal development	Facial, axillary, pubic, and body hair growth
Voice deepening	Scalp temporal recession and pattern hair loss
Increased sebum production and acne	
Increased sex drive and erections	

In addition to normal biological functions, DHT also plays an important causative role in a number of androgen-dependent conditions including hair conditions like hirsutism (excessive facial/body hair growth) and pattern hair loss (androgenic alopecia or pattern baldness) and prostate diseases such as benign prostatic hyperplasia (BPH) and prostate cancer. 5α-Reductase inhibitors, which prevent DHT synthesis, are effective in the prevention and treatment of these conditions. Androgen deprivation is a therapeutic approach to prostate cancer that can be implemented by castration to eliminate gonadal testosterone as a precursor to DHT, but metastatic tumors may then develop into castration-resistant prostate cancer (CRPC). Although castration results in 90-95% decrease of serum testosterone, DHT in the prostate is only decreased by 50%, supporting the notion that the prostate expresses necessary enzymes (including 5α-reductase) to produce DHT without testicular testosterone, that outline the importance of 5α-reductase inhibitors.

DHT may play a function in skeletal muscle amino acid transporter recruitment and function.

Metabolites of DHT have been found to act as neurosteroids with their own AR-independent biological activity. 3α-Androstanediol is a potent positive allosteric modulator of the GABA_{A} receptor, while 3β-androstanediol is a potent and selective agonist of the estrogen receptor (ER) subtype ERβ. These metabolites may play important roles in the central effects of DHT and by extension testosterone, including their antidepressant, anxiolytic, rewarding/hedonic, anti-stress, and pro-cognitive effects.

=== 5α-Reductase 2 deficiency ===
Much of the biological role of DHT has been characterized in studies of individuals with congenital 5α-reductase type 2 deficiency, an intersex condition caused by a loss-of-function mutation in the gene encoding 5α-reductase type 2, the major enzyme responsible for the production of DHT in the body. It is characterized by a defective and non-functional 5α-reductase type 2 enzyme and a partial but majority loss of DHT production in the body. In the condition, circulating testosterone levels are within or slightly above the normal male range, but DHT levels are low (around 30% of normal), and the ratio of circulating testosterone to DHT is greatly elevated (at about 3.5 to 5 times higher than normal).

Genetic males (46,XY) with 5α-reductase type 2 deficiency are born with undervirilization including pseudohermaphroditism (ambiguous genitalia), pseudovaginal perineoscrotal hypospadias, and usually undescended testes. Their external genitalia are female-like, with micropenis (a small, clitoris-like phallus), a partially unfused, labia-like scrotum, and a blind-ending, shallow vaginal pouch. Due to their lack of conspicuous male genitalia, genetic males with the condition are typically raised as girls. At the time of puberty however, they develop striking phenotypically masculine secondary sexual characteristics including partial virilization of the genitals (enlargement of the phallus into a near-functional penis and descent of the testes), voice deepening, typical male musculoskeletal development, and no menstruation, breast development, or other signs of feminization that occur during female puberty. In addition, normal libido and spontaneous erections develop, they usually show a sexual preference for females, and almost all develop a male gender identity. However, this identification may be influenced by cultural factors, as the rate of gender change ranged from 16% to 70% in one study, with Turkey having the highest rate.

Nonetheless, males with 5α-reductase type 2 deficiency exhibit signs of continued undervirilization in a number of domains. Facial hair was absent or sparse in a relatively large group of Dominican males with the condition, known as the Güevedoces. However, more facial hair has been observed in patients with the disorder from other parts of the world, although facial hair was still reduced relative to that of other men in the same communities. The divergent findings may reflect racial differences in androgen-dependent hair growth. A female pattern of androgenic hair growth, with terminal hair largely restricted to the axillae and lower pubic triangle, is observed in males with the condition. No temporal recession of the hairline or androgenic alopecia (pattern hair loss or baldness) has been observed in any of the cases of 5α-reductase type 2 deficiency that have been reported, whereas this is normally seen to some degree in almost all Caucasian males in their teenage years. Individuals with 5α-reductase type 2 deficiency were initially reported to have no incidence of acne, but subsequent research indicated normal sebum secretion and acne incidence.

In genetic males with 5α-reductase type 2 deficiency, the prostate gland is rudimentary or absent, and if present, remains small, underdeveloped, and unpalpable throughout life. In addition, neither BPH nor prostate cancer have been reported in these individuals. Genetic males with the condition generally show oligozoospermia due to undescended testes, but spermatogenesis is reported to be normal in those with testes that have descended, and there are case instances of men with the condition successfully fathering children.

Unlike males, genetic females with 5α-reductase type 2 deficiency are phenotypically normal. However, similarly to genetic males with the condition, they show reduced body hair growth, including an absence of hair on the arms and legs, slightly decreased axillary hair, and moderately decreased pubic hair. On the other hand, sebum production is normal. This is in accordance with the fact that sebum secretion appears to be entirely under the control of 5α-reductase type 1.

=== 5α-Reductase inhibitors ===
5α-Reductase inhibitors like finasteride and dutasteride inhibit 5α-reductase type 2 and/or other isoforms and are able to decrease circulating DHT levels by 65 to 98% depending on the 5α-reductase inhibitor in question. As such, similarly to the case of 5α-reductase type 2 deficiency, they provide useful insights in the elucidation of the biological functions of DHT. 5α-Reductase inhibitors were developed and are used primarily for the treatment of BPH. The drugs are able to significantly reduce the size of the prostate gland and to alleviate symptoms of the condition. Long-term treatment with 5α-reductase inhibitors is also able to significantly reduce the overall risk of prostate cancer, although a simultaneous small increase in the risk of certain high-grade tumors has been observed. In addition to prostate diseases, 5α-reductase inhibitors have subsequently been developed and introduced for the treatment of pattern hair loss in men. They are able to prevent further progression of hair loss in most men with the condition and to produce some recovery of hair in about two-thirds of men. 5α-Reductase inhibitors seem to be less effective for pattern hair loss in women on the other hand, although they do still show some effectiveness. Aside from pattern hair loss, the drugs are also useful in the treatment of hirsutism and can greatly reduce facial and body hair growth in women with the condition.

5α-Reductase inhibitors are overall well tolerated and show a low incidence of adverse effects. Sexual dysfunction, including erectile dysfunction, loss of libido, and reduced ejaculate volume, may occur in 3.4 to 15.8% of men treated with finasteride or dutasteride. A small increase in the risk of affective symptoms including depression, anxiety, and self-harm may be seen. However risk within the affected group can vary very strongly with some patients vividly reporting very strong persistent effects. Both the sexual dysfunction and affective symptoms may be due partially or fully to prevention of the synthesis of neurosteroids like allopregnanolone rather necessarily than due to inhibition of DHT production. A small risk of gynecomastia has been associated with 5α-reductase inhibitors (1.2–3.5%). Based on reports of 5α-reductase type 2 deficiency in males and the effectiveness of 5α-reductase inhibitors for hirsutism in women, reduced body and/or facial hair growth is a likely potential side effect of these drugs in men. There are far fewer studies evaluating the side effects of 5α-reductase inhibitors in women. However, due to the known role of DHT in male sexual differentiation, 5α-reductase inhibitors may cause birth defects such as ambiguous genitalia in the male fetuses of pregnant women. As such, they are not used in women during pregnancy.

MK-386 is a selective 5α-reductase type 1 inhibitor which was never marketed. Whereas 5α-reductase type 2 inhibitors achieve much higher reductions in circulating DHT production, MK-386 decreases circulating DHT levels by 20 to 30%. Conversely, it was found to decrease sebum DHT levels by 55% in men versus a modest reduction of only 15% for finasteride. However, MK-386 failed to show significant effectiveness in a subsequent clinical study for the treatment of acne.

== Biological activity ==
DHT is a potent agonist of the androgen receptor (AR), and is the AR's most potent known endogenous ligand. It has an affinity (K_{d}) of 0.25 to 0.5 nM for the human AR, which is about 2- to 3-fold higher than that of testosterone (K_{d} = 0.4 to 1.0 nM) and 15–30 times higher than that of adrenal androgens. In addition, the dissociation rate of DHT from the AR is 5-fold slower than that of testosterone. The EC_{50} of DHT for activation of the AR is 0.13 nM, which is about 5-fold stronger than that of testosterone (EC_{50} = 0.66 nM). In bioassays, DHT has been found to be 2.5- to 10-fold more potent than testosterone.

The elimination half-life of DHT in the body (53 minutes) is longer than that of testosterone (34 minutes), and this may account for some of the difference in their potency. A study of transdermal (patches) DHT and testosterone treatment reported terminal half-lives of 2.83 hours and 1.29 hours, respectively.

Unlike other androgens such as testosterone, DHT cannot be converted by the enzyme aromatase into an estrogen like estradiol. Therefore, it is frequently used in research settings to distinguish between the effects of testosterone caused by binding to the AR and those caused by testosterone's conversion to estradiol and subsequent binding to and activation of ERs. Although DHT cannot be aromatized, it is still transformed into metabolites with significant ER affinity and activity. These are 3α-androstanediol and 3β-androstanediol, which are predominant agonists of the ERβ.

== Biochemistry ==
Comprehensive overview of steroidogenesis, showing DHT around the bottom middle among the androgens

=== Biosynthesis ===
DHT is synthesized irreversibly from testosterone by the enzyme 5α-reductase. This occurs in various tissues including the genitals (penis, scrotum, clitoris, labia majora), prostate gland, skin, hair follicles, liver, and brain. Around 5 to 7% of testosterone undergoes 5α-reduction into DHT, and approximately 200 to 300 μg of DHT is synthesized in the body per day. Most DHT is produced in peripheral tissues like the skin and liver, whereas most circulating DHT originates specifically from the liver. The testes and prostate gland contribute relatively little to concentrations of DHT in circulation.

There are two major isoforms of 5α-reductase, SRD5A1 (type 1) and SRD5A2 (type 2), with the latter being the most biologically important isoenzyme. There is also third 5α-reductase: SRD5A3. SRD5A2 is most highly expressed in the genitals, prostate gland, epididymides, seminal vesicles, genital skin, facial and chest hair follicles, and liver, while lower expression is observed in certain brain areas, non-genital skin/hair follicles, testes, and kidneys. SRD5A1 is most highly expressed in non-genital skin/hair follicles, the liver, and certain brain areas, while lower levels are present in the prostate, epididymides, seminal vesicles, genital skin, testes, adrenal glands, and kidneys. In the skin, 5α-reductase is expressed in sebaceous glands, sweat glands, epidermal cells, and hair follicles. Both isoenzymes are expressed in scalp hair follicles, although SRD5A2 predominates in these cells. The SRD5A2 subtype is the almost exclusive isoform expressed in the prostate gland.

==== Backdoor pathway ====
The androgen backdoor pathway (red arrows) roundabout testosterone embedded in within conventional androgen synthesis that lead to 5α-dihydrotestosterone through testosterone

DHT under certain normal and pathological conditions can additionally be produced via a route that does not involve testosterone as an intermediate but instead goes through other intermediates. This route is called the "backdoor pathway".

The pathway can start from 17α-hydroxyprogesterone or from progesterone and can be outlined as follows (depending on the initial substrate):

- 17α-hydroxyprogesterone → 5α-pregnan-17α-ol-3,20-dione → 5α-pregnane-3α,17α-diol-20-one → androsterone → 5α-androstane-3α,17β-diol → DHT.
- progesterone → 5α-dihydroprogesterone → allopregnanolone → 5α-pregnane-3α,17α-diol-20-one → androsterone → 5α-androstane-3α,17β-diol → DHT.

This pathway is not always considered in the clinical evaluation of patients with hyperandrogenism, for instance due to rare disorders of sex development like 21α-hydroxylase deficiency. Ignoring this pathway in such instances may lead to diagnostic pitfalls and confusion, when the conventional androgen biosynthetic pathway cannot fully explain the observed consequences.

As with the conventional pathway of DHT synthesis, the backdoor pathway similarly requires 5α-reductase. Whereas 5α-reduction is the last transformation in the classical androgen pathway, it is the first step in the backdoor pathway.

=== Distribution ===
The plasma protein binding of DHT is more than 99%. In men, approximately 0.88% of DHT is unbound and hence free, while in premenopausal women, about 0.47–0.48% is unbound. In men, DHT is bound 49.7% to sex hormone-binding globulin (SHBG), 39.2% to albumin, and 0.22% to corticosteroid-binding globulin (CBG), while in premenopausal women, DHT is bound 78.1–78.4% to SHBG, 21.0–21.3% to albumin, and 0.12% to CBG. In late pregnancy, only 0.07% of DHT is unbound in women; 97.8% is bound to SHBG while 2.15% is bound to albumin and 0.04% is bound to CBG. DHT has higher affinity for SHBG than does testosterone, estradiol, or any other steroid hormone.

Plasma protein binding of testosterone and dihydrotestosterone
Compound	Group	Level (nM)	Free (%)	SHBG (%)	CBG (%)	Albumin (%)
Testosterone	Adult men	23.0	2.23	44.3	3.56	49.9
Testosterone	Adult women					
Testosterone	Follicular phase	1.3	1.36	66.0	2.26	30.4
Testosterone	Luteal phase	1.3	1.37	65.7	2.20	30.7
Testosterone	Pregnancy	4.7	0.23	95.4	0.82	3.6
Dihydrotestosterone	Adult men	1.70	0.88	49.7	0.22	39.2
Dihydrotestosterone	Adult women					
Dihydrotestosterone	Follicular phase	0.65	0.47	78.4	0.12	21.0
Dihydrotestosterone	Luteal phase	0.65	0.48	78.1	0.12	21.3
Dihydrotestosterone	Pregnancy	0.93	0.07	97.8	0.04	21.2
Sources: See template.

=== Metabolism ===
Testosterone metabolism in humans
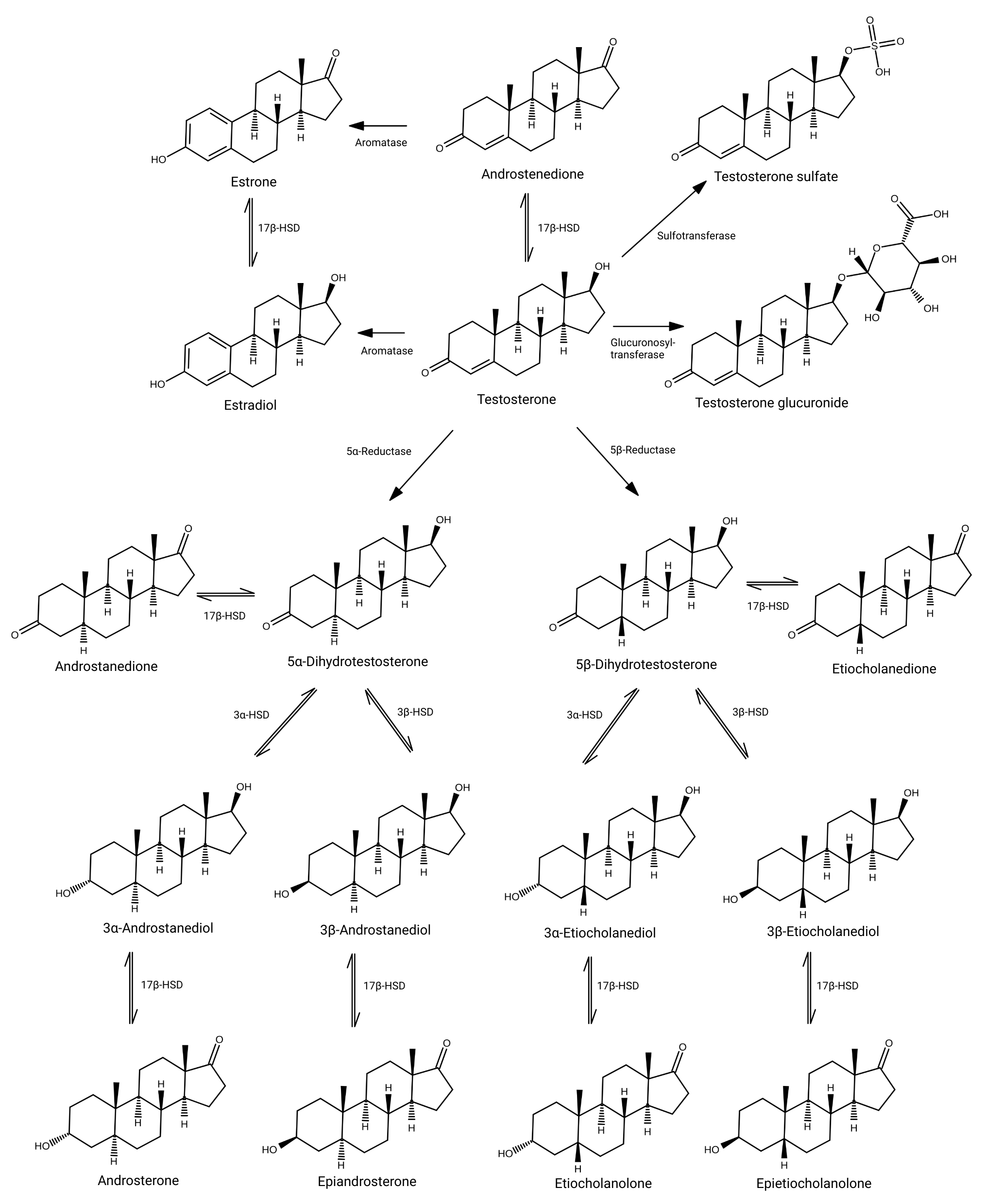
This diagram illustrates the metabolic pathways involved in the metabolism of DHT in humans. In addition to the transformations shown in the diagram, conjugation (e.g., sulfation and glucuronidation) occurs with DHT and metabolites that have one or more available hydroxyl (–OH) groups.

DHT is inactivated in the liver and extrahepatic tissues like the skin into 3α-androstanediol and 3β-androstanediol by the enzymes 3α-hydroxysteroid dehydrogenase and 3β-hydroxysteroid dehydrogenase, respectively. These metabolites are in turn converted, respectively, into androsterone and epiandrosterone, then conjugated (via glucuronidation and/or sulfation), released into circulation, and excreted in urine.

Unlike testosterone, DHT cannot be aromatized into an estrogen like estradiol, and for this reason, has no propensity for estrogenic effects.

=== Excretion ===
DHT is excreted in the urine as metabolites, such as conjugates of 3α-androstanediol and androsterone.

=== Levels ===
Ranges for circulating total DHT levels tested with HPLC–MS/MS and reported by LabCorp are as follows:

- Men: 30–85 ng/dL
- Women: 4–22 ng/dL
- Prepubertal children: <3 ng/dL
- Pubertal boys: 3–65 ng/dL (mean at Tanner stage 5: 43 ng/dL)
- Pubertal girls: 3–19 ng/dL (mean at Tanner stage 5: 9 ng/dL)

Ranges for circulating free DHT levels tested with HPLC–MS/MS and equilibrium dialysis and reported by LabCorp are as follows:

- <18 years of age: not established
- Adult males: 2.30–11.60 pg/mL (0.54–2.58% free)
- Adult females: 0.09–1.02 pg/mL (<1.27% free)

Other studies and labs assessing circulating total DHT levels with LC–MS/MS have reported ranges of 11–95 ng/dL (0.38–3.27 nmol/L) in adult men, 14–77 ng/dL (0.47–2.65 nmol/L) for healthy adult men (age 18–59 years), 23–102 ng/dL (0.8–3.5 nmol/L) for community-dwelling adult men (age <65 years), and 14–92 ng/dL (0.49–3.2 nmol/L) for healthy older men (age 71–87 years). In the case of women, mean circulating DHT levels have been found to be about 9 ng/dL (0.3 nmol/L) in premenopausal women and 3 ng/dL (0.1 nmol/L) in postmenopausal women. There was no variation in DHT levels across the menstrual cycle in premenopausal women, which is in contrast to testosterone (which shows a peak at mid-cycle). With immunoassay-based techniques, testosterone levels in premenopausal women have been found to be about 40 ng/dL (1.4 nmol/L) and DHT levels about 10 ng/dL (0.34 nmol/L). With radioimmunoassays, the ranges for testosterone and DHT levels in women have been found to be 20 to 70 ng/dL and 5 to 30 ng/dL, respectively.

Levels of total testosterone, free testosterone, and free DHT, but not total DHT, all measured with LC–MS/MS, are higher in women with polyendocrine metabolic ovarian syndrome (PMOS) than in women without this condition.

Circulating DHT levels in eugonadal men are about 7- to 10-fold lower than those of testosterone, and plasma levels of testosterone and DHT are highly correlated (correlation coefficient of 0.7). In contrast to the circulation however, levels of DHT in the prostate gland are approximately 5- to 10-fold higher than those of testosterone. This is due to a more than 90% conversion of testosterone into DHT in the prostate via locally expressed 5α-reductase. Because of this, and because DHT is much more potent as an androgen receptor agonist than testosterone, DHT is the major androgen in the prostate gland.

== Medical use ==
DHT is available in pharmaceutical formulations for medical use as an androgen or anabolic–androgenic steroid (AAS). It is used mainly in the treatment of male hypogonadism. When used as a medication, dihydrotestosterone is referred to as androstanolone (INN) or as stanolone (BAN), and is sold under brand names such as Andractim among others. The availability of pharmaceutical DHT is limited; it is not available in the United States or Canada, but is available in certain European countries. The available formulations of DHT include buccal or sublingual tablets, topical gels, and, as esters in oil, injectables like androstanolone propionate and androstanolone valerate.

== Performance enhancement ==
DHT has been used as a performance enhancing drug, specifically as an alternative to testosterone, as it was once known to be capable of falsifying drug tests.

== Chemistry ==
DHT, also known as 5α-androstan-17β-ol-3-one, is a naturally occurring androstane steroid with a ketone group at the C3 position and a hydroxyl group at the C17β position. It is the derivative of testosterone in which the double bond between the C4 and C5 positions has been reduced or hydrogenated.

== History ==
DHT was first synthesized by Adolf Butenandt and his colleagues in 1935. It was prepared via hydrogenation of testosterone, which had been discovered earlier that year. DHT was introduced for medical use as an AAS in 1953, and was noted to be more potent than testosterone but with reduced androgenicity. It was not determined to be an endogenous substance until 1956, when it was shown to be formed from testosterone in rat liver homogenates. In addition, the biological importance of DHT was not realized until the early 1960s, when it was found to be produced by 5α-reductase from circulating testosterone in target tissues like the prostate gland and seminal vesicles and was found to be more potent than testosterone in bioassays. The biological functions of DHT in humans became much more clearly defined upon the discovery and characterization of 5α-reductase type 2 deficiency in 1974. DHT was the last major sex hormone, the others being testosterone, estradiol, and progesterone, to be discovered, and is unique in that it is the only major sex hormone that functions principally as an intracrine and paracrine hormone rather than as an endocrine hormone.

DHT was one of the original "underground" methods used to falsify drug testing in sport, as DHT does not alter the ratio of testosterone to epistestosterone in an athlete's urinary steroid profile, a measurement that was once the basis of drug tests used to detect steroid use. However, DHT use can still be detected by other means which are now universal in athletic drug tests, such as metabolite analysis.

In 2004, Richard Auchus, in a review published in Trends in Endocrinology and Metabolism coined the term "backdoor pathway" as a metabolic route to DHT that: 1) bypasses conventional intermediates androstenedione and testosterone; 2) involves 5α-reduction of 21-carbon (C21) pregnanes to 19-carbon (C19) androstanes; and 3) involves the 3α-oxidation of 5α-androstane-3α,17β-diol to DHT. This newly discovered pathway explained how DHT is produced under certain normal and pathological conditions in humans when the classical androgen pathway (via testosterone) cannot fully explain the observed consequences. This review was based on earlier works (published in 2000–2004) by Shaw et al., Wilson et al., and Mahendroo et al., who studied DHT biosynthesis in tammar wallaby pouch young and mice.

In 2011, Chang et al. demonstrated that yet another metabolic pathway to DHT was dominant and possibly essential in castration-resistant prostate cancer (CRPC). This pathway can be outlined as androstenedione → 5α-androstane-3,17-dione → DHT. While this pathway was described as the "5α-dione pathway" in a 2012 review, the existence of such a pathway in the prostate was hypothesized in a 2008 review by Luu-The et al.
