= Estradiol butyrylacetate/testosterone ketolaurate/reserpine =

Combination drug

Estradiol butyrylacetate / testosterone ketolaurate

- Estradiol butyrylacetate (top) and testosterone ketolaurate (bottom)

Combination of
- Estradiol butyrylacetate: Estrogen
- Testosterone ketolaurate: Androgen; Anabolic steroid
- Reserpine: Antipsychotic

Clinical data
- Trade names: Klimanosid R-Depot
- Other names: EBA/TKL; EBA/TCA
- Routes of administration: Intramuscular injection

Estradiol butyrylacetate/testosterone ketolaurate/reserpine (EBA/TKL/R), sold under the brand name Klimanosid R-Depot, is an injectable combination medication of estradiol butyrylacetate (EBA), an estrogen, testosterone ketolaurate (TKL; testosterone caprinoylacetate), an androgen/anabolic steroid, and reserpine, an antipsychotic, which was previously used in menopausal hormone therapy for women, particularly in those with pronounced neurovegetative symptoms. It contains 2 mg EBA, 50 mg TKL, and 0.4 mg reserpine in oil solution in each 1 mL ampoule and is administered by intramuscular injection at regular intervals. The medication was marketed in 1957.

EBA/TKL reportedly has a duration of about 21 days.

Oral tablet products with the same brand names of Klimanosid and Klimanosid R, containing methylestradiol and methyltestosterone, with and without reserpine, were marketed around the same time as Klimanosid-R Depot, and should not be confused with the injectable formulation.

Androgen replacement therapy formulations and dosages used in women
Route	Medication	Major brand names	Form	Dosage
Oral	Testosterone undecanoate	Andriol, Jatenzo	Capsule	40–80 mg 1x/1–2 days
Oral	Methyltestosterone	Metandren, Estratest	Tablet	0.5–10 mg/day
Oral	Fluoxymesterone	Halotestin	Tablet	1–2.5 mg 1x/1–2 days
Oral	Normethandrone^{a}	Ginecoside	Tablet	5 mg/day
Oral	Tibolone	Livial	Tablet	1.25–2.5 mg/day
Oral	Prasterone (DHEA)^{b}	–	Tablet	10–100 mg/day
Sublingual	Methyltestosterone	Metandren	Tablet	0.25 mg/day
Transdermal	Testosterone	Intrinsa	Patch	150–300 μg/day
Transdermal	Testosterone	AndroGel	Gel, cream	1–10 mg/day
Vaginal	Prasterone (DHEA)	Intrarosa	Insert	6.5 mg/day
Injection	Testosterone propionate^{a}	Testoviron	Oil solution	25 mg 1x/1–2 weeks
Injection	Testosterone enanthate	Delatestryl, Primodian Depot	Oil solution	25–100 mg 1x/4–6 weeks
Injection	Testosterone cypionate	Depo-Testosterone, Depo-Testadiol	Oil solution	25–100 mg 1x/4–6 weeks
Injection	Testosterone isobutyrate^{a}	Femandren M, Folivirin	Aqueous suspension	25–50 mg 1x/4–6 weeks
Injection	Mixed testosterone esters	Climacteron^{a}	Oil solution	150 mg 1x/4–8 weeks
Injection	Mixed testosterone esters	Omnadren, Sustanon	Oil solution	50–100 mg 1x/4–6 weeks
Injection	Nandrolone decanoate	Deca-Durabolin	Oil solution	25–50 mg 1x/6–12 weeks
Injection	Prasterone enanthate^{a}	Gynodian Depot	Oil solution	200 mg 1x/4–6 weeks
Implant	Testosterone	Testopel	Pellet	50–100 mg 1x/3–6 months
Notes: Premenopausal women produce about 230 ± 70 μg testosterone per day (6.4 ± 2.0 mg testosterone per 4 weeks), with a range of 130 to 330 μg per day (3.6–9.2 mg per 4 weeks). Footnotes: ^{a} = Mostly discontinued or unavailable. ^{b} = Over-the-counter. Sources: See template.

== See also ==
- List of combined sex-hormonal preparations
