= Estradiol benzoate/estradiol phenylpropionate/testosterone propionate/testosterone phenylpropionate/testosterone isocaproate =

Combination drug

EB/EPP/TP/TPP/TiC
Combination of
- Estradiol benzoate: Estrogen
- Estradiol phenylpropionate: Estrogen
- Testosterone propionate: Androgen; Anabolic steroid
- Testosterone phenylpropionate: Androgen; Anabolic steroid
- Testosterone isocaproate: Androgen; Anabolic steroid

Clinical data
- Trade names: Estandron Prolongatum, Lynandron Prolongatum, Mixogen
- Other names: EB/EPP/TP/TPP/TiC
- Routes of administration: Intramuscular injection

Identifiers
- CAS Number: 62963-82-0
- PubChem CID: 3081537
- ChemSpider: 2339122

Estradiol benzoate/estradiol phenylpropionate/testosterone propionate/testosterone phenylpropionate/testosterone isocaproate (EB/EPP/TP/TPP/TiC), sold under the brand names Estandron Prolongatum, Lynandron Prolongatum, and Mixogen, was an injectable combination medication of the estrogens estradiol benzoate (EB) and estradiol phenylpropionate (EPP) and the androgens/anabolic steroids testosterone propionate (TP), testosterone phenylpropionate (TPP), and testosterone isocaproate (TiC) which was used in menopausal hormone therapy for women. It was also used to suppress lactation in postpartum women.

The medication was provided in the form of 1 mL ampoules and 2 mL vials containing 1 mg/mL EB, 4 mg/mL EPP, 20 mg/mL TP, 40 mg/mL TPP, and 40 mg/mL TiC in an oil solution and was administered by intramuscular injection. EB/EPP/TP/TPP/TiC reportedly has a duration of about 14 days.

Estandron Prolongatum, Lynandron Prolongatum, and Mixogen were all introduced for medical use by 1956. Oral tablet products with the same brand names of Estandron, Lynandron, and Mixogen, containing ethinylestradiol and methyltestosterone, were marketed around the same time, and should not be confused with the injectable products. Estandron Prolongatum, Lynandron Prolongatum, and Mixogen remained marketed as late as the 1980s. EB/EPP/TP/TPP/TiC appears to no longer be marketed.

Androgen replacement therapy formulations and dosages used in women
Route	Medication	Major brand names	Form	Dosage
Oral	Testosterone undecanoate	Andriol, Jatenzo	Capsule	40–80 mg 1x/1–2 days
Oral	Methyltestosterone	Metandren, Estratest	Tablet	0.5–10 mg/day
Oral	Fluoxymesterone	Halotestin	Tablet	1–2.5 mg 1x/1–2 days
Oral	Normethandrone^{a}	Ginecoside	Tablet	5 mg/day
Oral	Tibolone	Livial	Tablet	1.25–2.5 mg/day
Oral	Prasterone (DHEA)^{b}	–	Tablet	10–100 mg/day
Sublingual	Methyltestosterone	Metandren	Tablet	0.25 mg/day
Transdermal	Testosterone	Intrinsa	Patch	150–300 μg/day
Transdermal	Testosterone	AndroGel	Gel, cream	1–10 mg/day
Vaginal	Prasterone (DHEA)	Intrarosa	Insert	6.5 mg/day
Injection	Testosterone propionate^{a}	Testoviron	Oil solution	25 mg 1x/1–2 weeks
Injection	Testosterone enanthate	Delatestryl, Primodian Depot	Oil solution	25–100 mg 1x/4–6 weeks
Injection	Testosterone cypionate	Depo-Testosterone, Depo-Testadiol	Oil solution	25–100 mg 1x/4–6 weeks
Injection	Testosterone isobutyrate^{a}	Femandren M, Folivirin	Aqueous suspension	25–50 mg 1x/4–6 weeks
Injection	Mixed testosterone esters	Climacteron^{a}	Oil solution	150 mg 1x/4–8 weeks
Injection	Mixed testosterone esters	Omnadren, Sustanon	Oil solution	50–100 mg 1x/4–6 weeks
Injection	Nandrolone decanoate	Deca-Durabolin	Oil solution	25–50 mg 1x/6–12 weeks
Injection	Prasterone enanthate^{a}	Gynodian Depot	Oil solution	200 mg 1x/4–6 weeks
Implant	Testosterone	Testopel	Pellet	50–100 mg 1x/3–6 months
Notes: Premenopausal women produce about 230 ± 70 μg testosterone per day (6.4 ± 2.0 mg testosterone per 4 weeks), with a range of 130 to 330 μg per day (3.6–9.2 mg per 4 weeks). Footnotes: ^{a} = Mostly discontinued or unavailable. ^{b} = Over-the-counter. Sources: See template.

== See also ==
- Estradiol benzoate/estradiol phenylpropionate
- List of combined sex-hormonal preparations
