= Dihydrofluoxymesterone =

Chemical compound

Clinical data
- Other names: U-7265; 5α-Dihydrofluoxymesterone; 9α-Fluoro-11β-hydroxy-17α-methyl-5α-dihydrotestosterone; 9α-Fluoro-11β-hydroxy-17α-methyl-5α-DHT; 9α-Fluoro-11β-hydroxy-17α-methyl-5α-androstan-17β-ol-3-one
- Routes of administration: By mouth
- Drug class: Androgen; Anabolic steroid

Identifiers
- CAS Number: 51773-60-5
- PubChem CID: 236179
- ChemSpider: 206123
- KEGG: C15338
- ChEBI: CHEBI:79840
- CompTox Dashboard (EPA): DTXSID50966086

Chemical and physical data
- Formula: C_{20}H_{31}FO_{3}
- Molar mass: 338.463 g·mol^{−1}
- 3D model (JSmol): Interactive image
- SMILES: C[C@]12CCC(=O)C[C@@H]1CC[C@@H]3[C@@]2([C@H](C[C@]4([C@H]3CC[C@]4(C)O)C)O)F
- InChI: InChI=1S/C20H31FO3/c1-17-8-6-13(22)10-12(17)4-5-15-14-7-9-19(3,24)18(14,2)11-16(23)20(15,17)21/h12,14-16,23-24H,4-11H2,1-3H3/t12-,14-,15-,16-,17-,18-,19-,20-/m0/s1; Key:OFGHFEJLUUXXNZ-XNMNPEGYSA-N

Dihydrofluoxymesterone (developmental code name U-7265) is an androgen and anabolic steroid (AAS) which was never marketed. It was assessed in the treatment of breast cancer in women in at least one clinical study in the 1970s and showed effectiveness similar to that of other AAS. The drug is the 5α-reduced analogue and metabolite of fluoxymesterone.

== See also ==
- Oxofluoxymesterone
