= Estradiol benzoate/estradiol phenylpropionate =

Combination drug

Estradiol benzoate / estradiol phenylpropionate

- Estradiol benzoate (top) and estradiol phenylpropionate (bottom)

Combination of
- Estradiol benzoate: Estrogen
- Estradiol phenylpropionate: Estrogen

Clinical data
- Trade names: Dimenformon Prolongatum
- Other names: EB/EPP; Org 369-2
- Routes of administration: Intramuscular injection

Identifiers
- CAS Number: 50-50-0; 26443-03-8
- PubChem CID: 162973
- ChemSpider: 143071
- UNII: 1S4CJB5ZGN; LS956OGN6U

Estradiol benzoate/estradiol phenylpropionate (EB/EPP), sold under the brand name Dimenformon Prolongatum, is an injectable combination formulation of estradiol benzoate (EB), a shorter-acting estrogen, and estradiol phenylpropionate (EPP), a longer-acting estrogen, which has been used in menopausal hormone therapy for women in Europe but appears to no longer be available. It has also been used to suppress lactation in women and has been used in feminizing hormone therapy for transgender women. It has been provided in the form of 1 mL ampoules containing 2.5 mg EB and 10 mg EPP in oil solution and is administered by intramuscular injection at regular intervals.

The pharmacokinetics of this formulation and its constituent components have been studied.

A combination of 12.5 mg EB and 10 mg EPP (developmental code name Org 369–2) has been studied for use in women as a postcoital contraceptive within 48 hours of unprotected sex.

== See also ==
- Estradiol/estradiol enanthate
- Estradiol benzoate/estradiol phenylpropionate/testosterone propionate/testosterone phenylpropionate/testosterone isocaproate
- Estradiol benzoate/estradiol valerate/hydroxyprogesterone caproate
- List of combined sex-hormonal preparations
