= Esterified estrogens/methyltestosterone =

Pharmaceutical combination

Esterified estrogens / methyltestosterone

- Estrone sulfate (top) and methyltestosterone (bottom)

Combination of
- Esterified estrogens: Estrogen
- Methyltestosterone: Androgen; Anabolic steroid

Clinical data
- Trade names: Covaryx, Essian, Estratest, Menogen, Syntest
- Other names: EEs/MT
- Routes of administration: By mouth
- Drug class: Estrogen; Androgen
- ATC code: G03EA01 (WHO)

Identifiers
- CAS Number: 928330-97-6

Esterified estrogens/methyltestosterone (EEs/MT), sold under brand names such as Covaryx, Eemt, Essian, Estratest, Menogen, and Syntest, is a hormonal preparation that combines esterified estrogens (EEs) with methyltestosterone (MT) in one tablet and is used in menopausal hormone therapy.

== Medical uses ==
EEs/MT is used to treat menopausal women who suffer from hot flashes, but do not get relief from estrogen-only therapy.

=== Available forms ===
EEs/MT is sold in tablet form, with either 1.25 mg EEs/2.5 mg MT or 0.625 mg EEs/1.25 mg MT available.

== Pharmacology ==
The product is a combination of esterified estrogens, an estrogen, and low-dose methyltestosterone, an androgen/anabolic steroid, in a single tablet.

== Side effects ==
EEs/MT treatment resulted in a relatively small number of serious adverse events.

== History ==
EEs/MT was first marketed in the United States in 1965 by Reid-Provident Laboratories, which as 100% of Reid-Rowell, Inc. stock was acquired by the Belgian pharmaceutical company Solvay in 1986. There has been some controversy surrounding the drug in recent years as to its status with the U.S. Food and Drug Administration.

Solvay sponsored a clinical trial of EEs/MT in the United States to determine whether the product is superior to treatment with esterified estrogens tablets.

EEs/MT was supplied by Solvay. In March 2009 Solvay announced that, based on a variety of business factors, it would discontinue supplying Estratest and Estratest HS tablets, and would stop accepting orders for the product on March 31, 2009.

== See also ==
- Conjugated estrogens/methyltestosterone
- List of combined sex-hormonal preparations
