= Estradiol benzoate/estradiol valerate/hydroxyprogesterone caproate =

Combination drug

Estradiol benzoate / estradiol valerate / hydroxyprogesterone caproate
Combination of
- Estradiol benzoate: Estrogen
- Estradiol valerate: Estrogen
- Hydroxyprogesterone caproate: Progestogen

Clinical data
- Trade names: Sin-Ol
- Other names: EB/EV/OHPC
- Routes of administration: Intramuscular injection

Estradiol benzoate/estradiol valerate/hydroxyprogesterone caproate (EB/EV/OHPC), sold under the brand name Sin-Ol, is a combination medication of estradiol benzoate (EB), an estrogen, estradiol valerate (EV), an estrogen, and hydroxyprogesterone caproate (OHPC), a progestin, which was reportedly used as a combined injectable contraceptive in women in the early 1970s. It contained 1 mg EB, 10 mg EV, and 250 mg OHPC in oil solution, was provided in the form of 3 mL ampoules, and was administered by intramuscular injection at regular intervals. The medication was manufactured by the pharmaceutical company Reuffer in Mexico.

== See also ==
- Estradiol benzoate/estradiol phenylpropionate
- Estradiol/estradiol enanthate
- List of combined sex-hormonal preparations § Estrogens and progestogens
