= 5α-Dihydronormethandrone =

Chemical compound

Clinical data
- Other names: 5α-DHNMT; RU-575; 17α-Methyl-4,5α-dihydro-19-nortestosterone; 17α-Methyl-5α-estran-17β-ol-3-one

Identifiers
- IUPAC name: (5S,8R,9R,10S,13S,14S,17S)-17-Hydroxy-13,17-dimethyl-1,2,4,5,6,7,8,9,10,11,12,14,15,16-tetradecahydrocyclopenta[a]phenanthren-3-one
- CAS Number: 6424-04-0
- PubChem CID: 22792507
- ChemSpider: 21473
- UNII: JHH2FT7BLU

Chemical and physical data
- Formula: C_{19}H_{30}O_{2}
- Molar mass: 290.447 g·mol^{−1}
- 3D model (JSmol): Interactive image
- SMILES: C[C@]12CC[C@H]3[C@H]([C@@H]1CC[C@]2(C)O)CC[C@@H]4[C@@H]3CCC(=O)C4
- InChI: InChI=MDXRCPMWSFWIEZ-MOVWYJJTSA-N; Key:1S/C19H30O2/c1-18-9-7-15-14-6-4-13(20)11-12(14)3-5-16(15)17(18)8-10-19(18,2)21/h12,14-17,21H,3-11H2,1-2H3/t12-,14-,15+,16+,17-,18-,19-/m0/s1

5α-Dihydronormethandrone (5α-DHNMT; developmental code name RU-575), also known as 17α-methyl-4,5α-dihydro-19-nortestosterone or as 17α-methyl-5α-estran-17β-ol-3-one, is an androgen/anabolic steroid and a likely metabolite of normethandrone formed by 5α-reductase. Analogously to nandrolone and its 5α-reduced metabolite 5α-dihydronandrolone, 5α-DHNMT shows reduced affinity for the androgen receptor relative to normethandrone. Its affinity for the androgen receptor is specifically about 33 to 60% of that of normethandrone.

Relative affinities (%) of normethandrone and metabolites
Compound	PR	AR	ER	GR	MR	SHBG	CBG
Normethandrone	75–125	125–150	<1	1–5	<1	?	?
5α-Dihydronormethandrone	15–25	50–75	?	<1	?	?	?
Notes: Values are percentages (%). Reference ligands (100%) were progesterone for the PR, testosterone for the AR, estradiol for the ER, dexamethasone for the GR, and aldosterone for the MR. Sources: See template.

== See also ==
- 5α-Dihydronorethandrolone
- 5α-Dihydronandrolone
- 5α-Dihydronorethisterone
- 5α-Dihydrolevonorgestrel
