= Conjugated estrogens/methyltestosterone =

Combination drug

Conjugated estrogens / methyltestosterone

- Estrone sulfate (top) and methyltestosterone (bottom)

Combination of
- Conjugated estrogens: Estrogen
- Methyltestosterone: Androgen; Anabolic steroid

Clinical data
- Trade names: Premarin with Methyltestosterone
- Other names: CEEs/MT; CEs/MT
- Routes of administration: By mouth
- Drug class: Estrogen; Androgen; Anabolic steroid

Legal status
- Legal status: US: ℞-only

Conjugated estrogens/methyltestosterone (CEEs/MT), sold under the brand name Premarin with Methyltestosterone, is a combination of conjugated estrogens (CEEs), an estrogen, and methyltestosterone (MT), an androgen and anabolic steroid (AAR), which is used in menopausal hormone therapy for women. It contains 0.625 to 1.25 mg CEEs and 5 to 10 mg MT. The medication was marketed by Wyeth-Ayerst. CEEs/MT was previously marketed in the United States and Canada. It remains available only in Paraguay, under the brand names Delitan and Delitan Forte.

== See also ==
- Esterified estrogens/methyltestosterone
- List of combined sex-hormonal preparations
