= Esterified estrogens =

Pharmaceutical drug

- Estrone sulfate, the primary active component in esterified estrogens (constitutes about 75 to 85% of total content).

- Equilin sulfate, the second most major active component in esterified estrogens (constitutes about 6 to 16% of total content).

Combination of
- Sodium estrone sulfate: Estrogen
- Sodium equilin sulfate: Estrogen

Clinical data
- Trade names: Estratab, Menest, others
- Other names: Esterified oestrogens; EEs; Esterified equine estrogens; Esterified equine oestrogens; EEEs
- Routes of administration: By mouth
- Drug class: Estrogen
- ATC code: None

Identifiers
- PubChem SID: 347910451
- DrugBank: DB09381
- UNII: 3ASP8Q3768

Esterified estrogens (EEs), sold under the brand names Estratab and Menest among others, are an estrogen medication which used in hormone therapy for menopausal symptoms and low sex hormone levels in women, to treat breast cancer in both women and men, and to treat prostate cancer in men. They are formulated alone or in combination with methyltestosterone. They are taken by mouth.

Side effects of EEs include nausea, breast tension, edema, and breakthrough bleeding among others. EEs are estrogen and agonist of the estrogen receptors, the biological target of estrogens like estradiol. EEs are a prodrug mainly of estradiol and to a lesser extent of equilin.

EEs were introduced for medical use by 1970. They are available in only a few countries, such as Chile and the United States. They have also been marketed in Argentina and Switzerland in the past.

== Medical uses ==
EEs are used in hormone therapy for menopausal symptoms, female hypogonadism, ovariectomy, and primary ovarian failure and in the treatment of breast cancer and prostate cancer.

Estrogen dosages for menopausal hormone therapy
Route/form	Estrogen	Low	Standard	High
Oral	Estradiol	0.5–1 mg/day	1–2 mg/day	2–4 mg/day
Oral	Estradiol valerate	0.5–1 mg/day	1–2 mg/day	2–4 mg/day
Oral	Estradiol acetate	0.45–0.9 mg/day	0.9–1.8 mg/day	1.8–3.6 mg/day
Oral	Conjugated estrogens	0.3–0.45 mg/day	0.625 mg/day	0.9–1.25 mg/day
Oral	Esterified estrogens	0.3–0.45 mg/day	0.625 mg/day	0.9–1.25 mg/day
Oral	Estropipate	0.75 mg/day	1.5 mg/day	3 mg/day
Oral	Estriol	1–2 mg/day	2–4 mg/day	4–8 mg/day
Oral	Ethinylestradiol^{a}	2.5–10 μg/day	5–20 μg/day	–
Nasal spray	Estradiol	150 μg/day	300 μg/day	600 μg/day
Transdermal patch	Estradiol	25 μg/day^{b}	50 μg/day^{b}	100 μg/day^{b}
Transdermal gel	Estradiol	0.5 mg/day	1–1.5 mg/day	2–3 mg/day
Vaginal	Estradiol	25 μg/day	–	–
Vaginal	Estriol	30 μg/day	0.5 mg 2x/week	0.5 mg/day
IM or SC injection	Estradiol valerate	–	–	4 mg 1x/4 weeks
IM or SC injection	Estradiol cypionate	1 mg 1x/3–4 weeks	3 mg 1x/3–4 weeks	5 mg 1x/3–4 weeks
IM or SC injection	Estradiol benzoate	0.5 mg 1x/week	1 mg 1x/week	1.5 mg 1x/week
SC implant	Estradiol	25 mg 1x/6 months	50 mg 1x/6 months	100 mg 1x/6 months
Footnotes: ^{a} = No longer used or recommended, due to health concerns. ^{b} = As a single patch applied once or twice per week (worn for 3–4 days or 7 days), depending on the formulation. Note: Dosages are not necessarily equivalent. Sources: See template.

=== Available forms ===
EEs are available in the form of 0.3 mg, 0.625 mg, 1.25 mg, and 2.5 mg oral tablets. Estratest is a combination formulation of 1.25 mg EEs with 2.5 mg methyltestosterone.

== Pharmacology ==
EEs consist primarily of sodium estrone sulfate and sodium equilin sulfate, and are very similar to conjugated estrogens (CEEs, conjugated equine estrogens; brand name Premarin). However, EEs and CEEs differ in the sources of their contents and in the percentages of their constituents; CEEs consist of approximately 53% sodium estrone sulfate and 25% sodium equilin sulfate, while EEs contain about 75 to 85% sodium estrone sulfate and 6 to 11% sodium equilin sulfate. EEs have been found to produce similar serum levels of estrone and estradiol relative to CEEs, although with higher levels of estrone and lower levels of equilin. One study found that the risk of venous thrombosis may be less with EEs relative to CEEs.

Relative oral potencies of estrogens
Estrogen	HF	VE	UCa	FSH	LH	HDL-C	SHBG	CBG	AGT	Liver
Estradiol	1.0	1.0	1.0	1.0	1.0	1.0	1.0	1.0	1.0	1.0
Estrone	?	?	?	0.3	0.3	?	?	?	?	?
Estriol	0.3	0.3	0.1	0.3	0.3	0.2	?	?	?	0.67
Estrone sulfate	?	0.9	0.9	0.8–0.9	0.9	0.5	0.9	0.5–0.7	1.4–1.5	0.56–1.7
Conjugated estrogens	1.2	1.5	2.0	1.1–1.3	1.0	1.5	3.0–3.2	1.3–1.5	5.0	1.3–4.5
Equilin sulfate	?	?	1.0	?	?	6.0	7.5	6.0	7.5	?
Ethinylestradiol	120	150	400	60–150	100	400	500–600	500–600	350	2.9–5.0
Diethylstilbestrol	?	?	?	2.9–3.4	?	?	26–28	25–37	20	5.7–7.5
Sources and footnotes Notes: Values are ratios, with estradiol as standard (i.e., 1.0). Abbreviations: HF = Clinical relief of hot flashes. VE = Increased proliferation of vaginal epithelium. UCa = Decrease in UCa. FSH = Suppression of FSH levels. LH = Suppression of LH levels. HDL-C, SHBG, CBG, and AGT = Increase in the serum levels of these liver proteins. Liver = Ratio of liver estrogenic effects to general/systemic estrogenic effects (hot flashes/gonadotropins). Sources: See template.

Protein binding and metabolic clearance rates of estrogens
Compound	RBA to SHBG (%)	Bound to SHBG (%)	Bound to albumin (%)	Total bound (%)	MCR (L/day/m^{2})
17β-Estradiol	50	37	61	98	580
Estrone	12	16	80	96	1050
Estriol	0.3	1	91	92	1110
Estrone sulfate	0	0	99	99	80
17β-Dihydroequilin	30	?	?	?	1250
Equilin	8	26	13	?	2640
17β-Dihydroequilin sulfate	0	?	?	?	375
Equilin sulfate	0	?	?	?	175
Δ^{8}-Estrone	?	?	?	?	1710
Notes: RBA for SHBG (%) is compared to 100% for testosterone. Sources: See template.

== Chemistry ==
EEs contain synthetic, plant-derived estrogens and are manufactured from soybeans and yams.

== History ==
EEs were introduced for medical use by 1970.

== Society and culture ==
=== Generic names ===
Estrogens, esterified is the generic name of the drug and its USP. It is also known as esterified estrogens.

=== Brand names ===
EEs are marketed under a variety of brand names including Amnestrogen, Estragyn, Estratab, Evex, Femibel, Femogen, Menest, Neo Estrone Tab, and Oestro-Feminal alone, and, in combination with methyltestosterone, under the brand names Covaryx, Delitan, Eemt, Essian, Estratest, Feminova-T, Menogen, and Syntest.

=== Availability ===
EEs are or have been marketed in Argentina, Chile, Switzerland, and the United States. Both EEs and the combination of EEs and methyltestosterone are listed as being marketed only in Chile and the United States as of present.

== See also ==
- Esterified estrogens/methyltestosterone
- Estrogenic substances
- Conjugated estriol
- List of combined sex-hormonal preparations
