= Estradiol/estradiol enanthate =

Combination drug

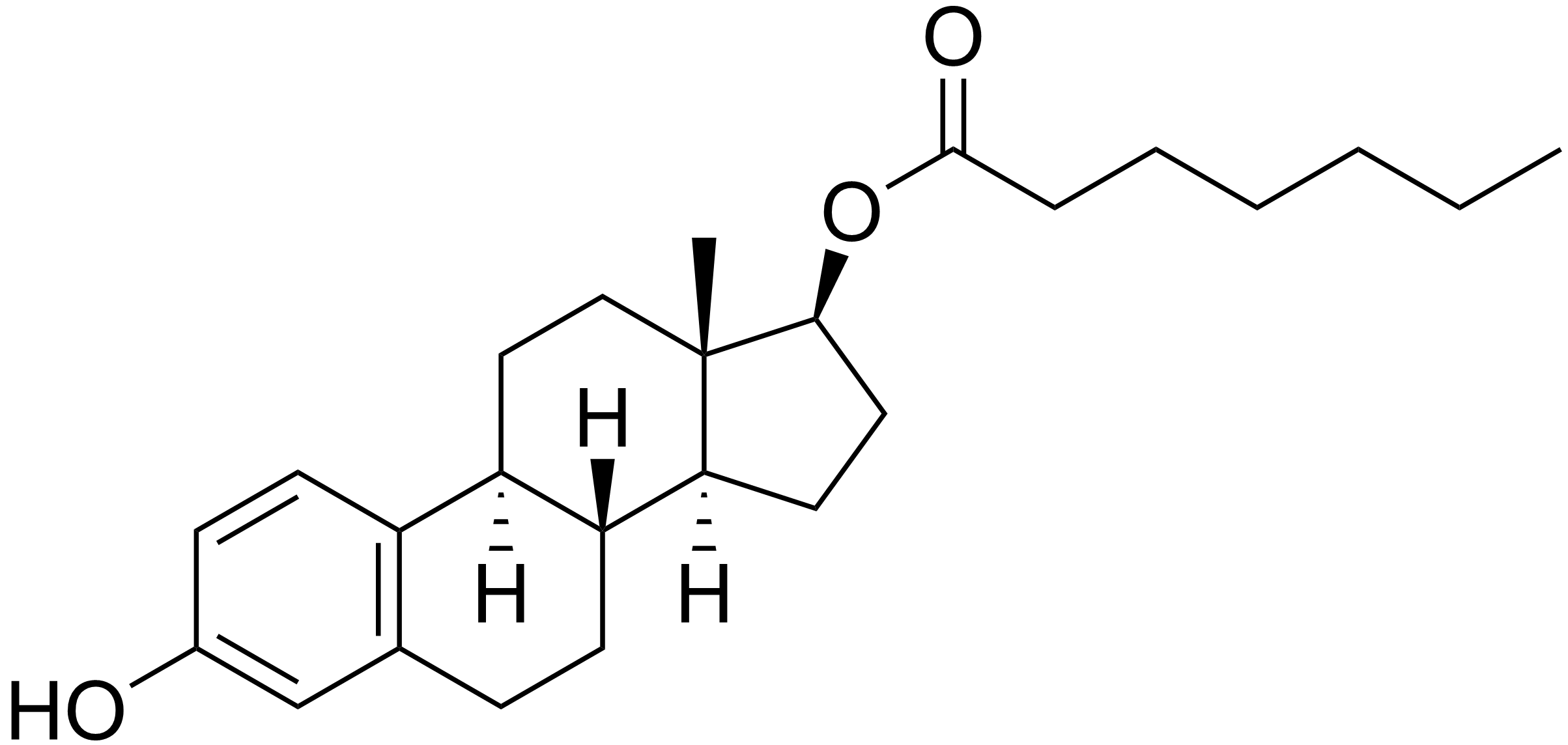
- Estradiol (top) and estradiol enanthate (bottom)

Combination of
- Estradiol: Estrogen
- Estradiol enanthate: Estrogen

Clinical data
- Other names: E2/E2-EN; E2/EEn
- Routes of administration: Intramuscular injection

Estradiol/estradiol enanthate (E2/E2-EN) is an injectable combination formulation of estradiol (E2), a short-acting estrogen, and estradiol enanthate (E2-EN), a long-acting estrogen, which was developed by Boehringer around 1960 for potential medical use but was never marketed. It contained 1 mg E2 and 9 mg E2-EN in oil solution and was intended for administration by intramuscular injection.

A single intramuscular injection of E2/E2-EN (1 mg/9 mg) has been found to result in a 10-fold increase in estradiol excretion on the 2nd day post-injection (due to the 1 mg short-acting E2 component). Following this, estradiol excretion remained above the menstrual-cycle average for 10 days post-injection and did not return to baseline until the 24th day post-injection (due to the 9 mg long-acting E2-EN component).

E2/E2-EN is similar to estradiol benzoate/estradiol phenylpropionate (brand name Dimenformon Prolongatum), another injectable combination medication of a shorter-acting estrogen (2.5 mg) and a longer-acting estrogen (10 mg). In contrast to E2/E2-EN however, estradiol benzoate/estradiol phenylpropionate was marketed for medical use.

== See also ==
- Estradiol benzoate/estradiol phenylpropionate
- Estradiol benzoate/estradiol valerate/hydroxyprogesterone caproate
- List of combined sex-hormonal preparations
