= Estradiol butyrylacetate =

Chemical compound

Clinical data
- Trade names: Follikosid, Follikoside, Klimanosid
- Other names: EBA; Estradiol 17β-butyrylacetate
- Routes of administration: Intramuscular injection
- Drug class: Estrogen; Estrogen ester

Identifiers
- IUPAC name: [(8R,9S,13S,14S,17S)-3-hydroxy-13-methyl-6,7,8,9,11,12,14,15,16,17-decahydrocyclopenta[a]phenanthren-17-yl] 3-oxohexanoate
- CAS Number: 60883-80-9
- PubChem CID: 91667672
- ChemSpider: 52084153
- UNII: 6ADI485E6C
- CompTox Dashboard (EPA): DTXSID301046408

Chemical and physical data
- Formula: C_{24}H_{32}O_{4}
- Molar mass: 384.516 g·mol^{−1}
- 3D model (JSmol): Interactive image
- SMILES: CCCC(=O)CC(=O)O[C@H]1CC[C@H]2[C@@H]3CCc4cc(O)ccc4[C@H]3CC[C@]12C
- InChI: InChI=1S/C24H32O4/c1-3-4-16(25)14-23(27)28-22-10-9-21-20-7-5-15-13-17(26)6-8-18(15)19(20)11-12-24(21,22)2/h6,8,13,19-22,26H,3-5,7,9-12,14H2,1-2H3/t19-,20-,21+,22+,24+/m1/s1; Key:LLWMXKOTHFASEO-NTYLBUJVSA-N

Estradiol butyrylacetate (EBA), sold under the brand names Follikosid and Klimanosid-R Depot (with testosterone ketolaurate and reserpine), is an estrogen medication which is no longer marketed. It is an estrogen ester, specifically, an ester of estradiol. It is administered by intramuscular injection and a single 10 mg dose has been said to have a duration of action of 2 to 3 weeks. The excretion of EBA in women has been studied.

== See also ==
- Estradiol butyrylacetate/testosterone ketolaurate/reserpine
- List of estrogen esters § Estradiol esters
