= Savient Pharmaceuticals =

Biopharmaceutical company

Savient pharmaceuticals
- Industry: Pharmaceuticals
- Defunct: 2013
- Headquarters: East Brunswick, New Jersey, United States
- Products: Pegloticase, oxandrolone
- Website: http://www.savientpharma.com/

Savient Pharmaceuticals was a New Jersey–based biopharmaceutical company. Its lead product, pegloticase, was a biologic drug for treatment resistant chronic gout, which it marketed beginning in 2011. It also marketed oxandrolone beginning in 1995.

== History ==
Savient was incorporated in 1980 as Bio-Technology General Corp and changed its name in 2003.

Savient later focused on commercializing pegloticase in the United States and completing the development and seeking regulatory approval in the European Union. The company also sold branded and generic versions of oxandrolone, a drug used to promote weight gain following involuntary weight loss. John H. Johnson was CEO from February 2011 until February 2012, formerly employed by Imclone Systems.

Savient declared bankruptcy in 2013. The drug was selling at $5,390 per vial—around $30,000 for a three-month course of treatment—at the time Savient went under.

Savient was then bought by Crealta. In 2015, Crealta was able to sell the asset to Horizon Pharma for $510 million that year.
