= Oxandrolone =

Androgen and anabolic steroid

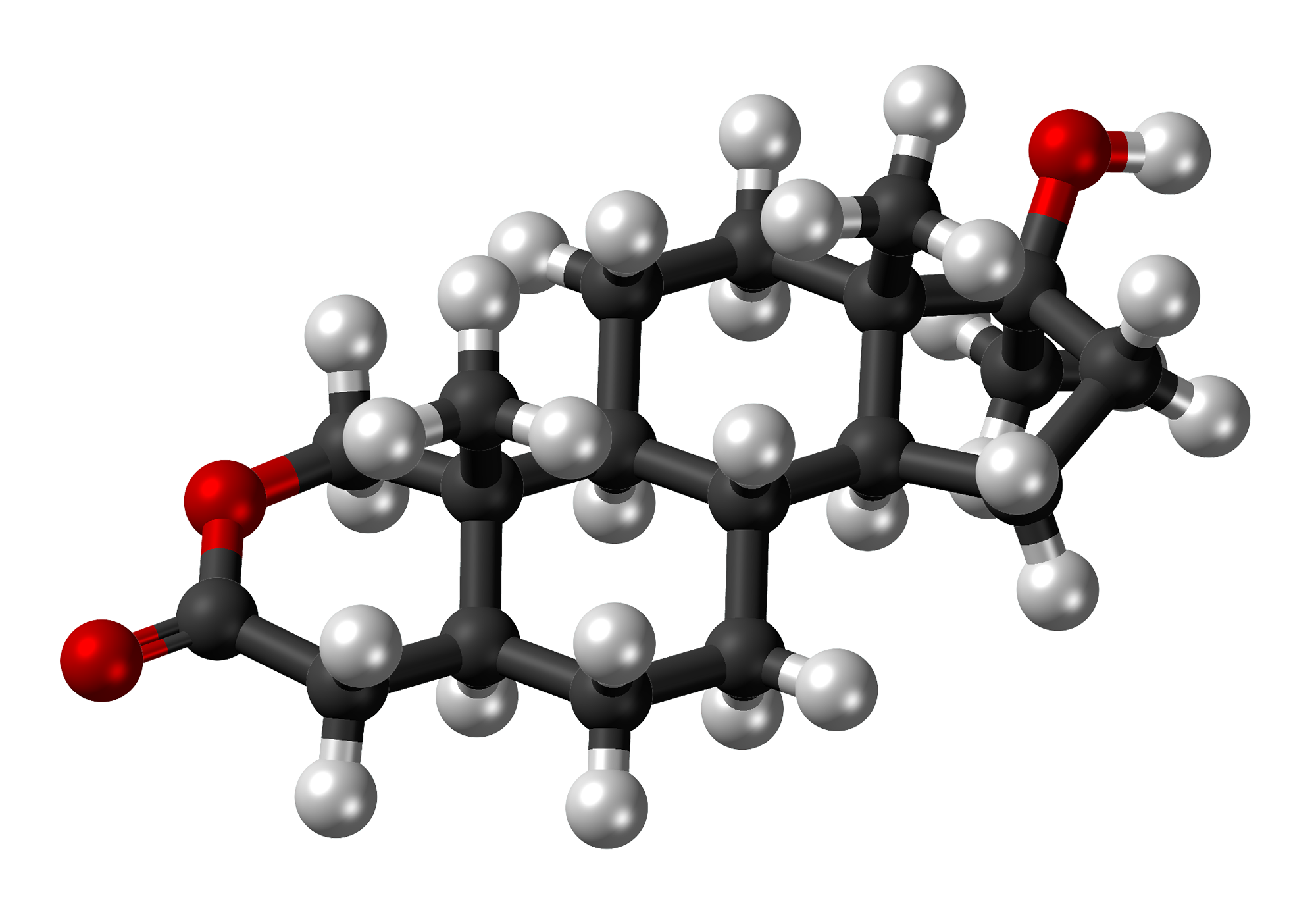

Clinical data
- Trade names: Oxandrin, Anavar, others
- Other names: Var; CB-8075; NSC-67068; SC-11585; Protivar; 17α-Methyl-2-oxa-4,5α-dihydrotestosterone; 17α-Methyl-2-oxa-DHT; 17α-Methyl-2-oxa-5α-androstan-17β-ol-3-one
- AHFS/Drugs.com: Monograph
- MedlinePlus: a604024
- Pregnancy category: X
- Routes of administration: By mouth
- Drug class: Androgen; Anabolic steroid
- ATC code: A14AA08 (WHO)

Legal status
- Legal status: BR: Class C5 (Anabolic steroids); CA: Schedule IV; US: Schedule III

Pharmacokinetic data
- Bioavailability: 97%
- Protein binding: 94–97%
- Metabolism: Kidneys (primarily), liver
- Elimination half-life: Adults: 9.4–10.4 hours Elderly: 13.3 hours
- Excretion: Urine: 28% (unchanged); Feces: 3%

Identifiers
- IUPAC name: (1S,3aS,3bR,5aS,9aS,9bS,11aS)-1-hydroxy-1,9a,11a-trimethyl-2,3,3a,3b,4,5,5a,6,9,9b,10,11-dodecahydroindeno[4,5-h]isoch
- CAS Number: 53-39-4
- PubChem CID: 5878
- IUPHAR/BPS: 7092
- DrugBank: DB00621
- ChemSpider: 5667
- UNII: 7H6TM3CT4L
- KEGG: D00462
- ChEBI: CHEBI:7820
- ChEMBL: ChEMBL1200436
- CompTox Dashboard (EPA): DTXSID8023399
- ECHA InfoCard: 100.000.158

Chemical and physical data
- Formula: C_{19}H_{30}O_{3}
- Molar mass: 306.446 g·mol^{−1}
- 3D model (JSmol): Interactive image
- SMILES: C[C@]12CC[C@H]3[C@H]([C@@H]1CC[C@]2(C)O)CC[C@@H]4[C@@]3(COC(=O)C4)C
- InChI: InChI=1S/C19H30O3/c1-17-11-22-16(20)10-12(17)4-5-13-14(17)6-8-18(2)15(13)7-9-19(18,3)21/h12-15,21H,4-11H2,1-3H3/t12-,13+,14-,15-,17-,18-,19-/m0/s1; Key:QSLJIVKCVHQPLV-PEMPUTJUSA-N

Oxandrolone is an androgen and synthetic anabolic steroid (AAS) medication to help promote weight gain in various situations, to help offset protein catabolism caused by long-term corticosteroid therapy, to support recovery from severe burns, to treat bone pain associated with osteoporosis, to aid in the development of girls with Turner syndrome, and for other indications. It is taken by mouth. It was sold under the brand names Oxandrin and Anavar, among others.

The drug is a synthetic androgen and anabolic steroid, hence is an agonist of the androgen receptor (AR), the biological target of androgens such as testosterone and dihydrotestosterone. Side effects of oxandrolone include severe cases of peliosis hepatis, sometimes associated with liver failure and intra-abdominal hemorrhage; liver tumors, sometimes fatal; and blood lipid changes associated with increased risk of atherosclerosis. Additional warnings include the risks associated with cholestatic hepatitis, hypercalcemia in patients with breast cancer, and increased risk for the development of prostatic hypertrophy and prostatic carcinoma in older patients. It has strong anabolic effects and weak androgenic effects, which gave it a mild side effect profile in that regard and made it especially suitable for use in women. Milder side effects in women were increased sexual desire, symptoms of hyperandrogenism such as acne, and symptoms of masculinization such as increased hair growth and voice changes.

Oxandrolone was first described in 1962 and introduced for medical use in 1964. The drug is a controlled substance in many countries, so non-medical use for purposes such as improving physique and performance has been generally illicit.

In the United States, the FDA's Endocrinologic and Metabolic Drugs Advisory Committee unanimously concluded in 1984 that there was no evidence of efficacy for oxandrolone. On March 26, 2019, Gemini asked FDA to withdraw approval for all doses of the drug, stating that they were no longer marketing it. FDA notified Gemini and other license holders on December 16, 2022, that it believed that the potential problems with the drug that the drug were sufficiently serious that it should be removed from the market, citing the 1984 finding of lack of efficacy and the extensive safety warnings and precautions listed on the prescribing information, "including peliosis hepatis, sometimes associated with liver failure and intra-abdominal hemorrhage; liver cell tumors, sometimes fatal; and blood lipid changes that are known to be associated with increased risk of atherosclerosis" as well as "cholestatic hepatitis, hypercalcemia in patients with breast cancer, and increased risk for the development of prostatic hypertrophy and prostatic carcinoma in geriatric patients." Gemini and Sandoz requested that the FDA completely withdraw approval for the drug.

== Medical uses ==
Oxandrolone has been researched and prescribed as a treatment for a wide variety of conditions. Oxandrolone was FDA-approved for treating bone pain associated with osteoporosis, aiding weight gain following surgery or physical trauma, during chronic infection, or in the context of unexplained weight loss, HIV wasting syndrome, and counteracting the catabolic effect of long-term corticosteroid therapy. Oxandrolone is used to quicken recovery from severe burns.

In the management of severe burn injuries, clinical trials have demonstrated the therapeutic advantages of oxandrolone, and it was widely adopted as a standard treatment protocol in burn centers globally. Meta-analyses of clinical trials substantiate the efficacy of oxandrolone in severe burn cases: the benefits are manifold and significant, and include a reduction in catabolic weight loss, augmentation of lean body mass, enhancement of donor-site wound healing, and a decrease in the duration of both intensive care unit (ICU) and overall hospital stay. These benefits do not appear to be accompanied by an increased risk of infection, hyperglycemia, or hepatic dysfunction, which reflects the safety profile of oxandrolone in severe burn patient population. Data analysis confirms oxandrolone's advantage in promoting skin healing as an adjunct therapy for adult burn patients. Oxandrolone improves weight regain, bone mineral density, lean body mass, and accelerates wound healing for donor graft sites. Oxandrolone was recommended as an adjunctive therapy, alongside insulin, metformin, and closely monitored propranolol, in severe burn patients, for metabolic and nutritional support. Oxandrolone improves both short-term and long-term outcomes in people recovering from severe burns and was well-established as a safe treatment for this indication. One of the underlying mechanisms in burn management is that oxandrolone helps reduce hypermetabolic response, which is characterized by increased energy expenditure, elevated stress hormones levels such as cortisol, insulin resistance, muscle wasting, and impaired wound healing; this response is reduced by improving whole-body nitrogen balance as well as preserving lean body mass during recovery.

As of 2019, oxandrolone was prescribed off-label for the development of girls with Turner syndrome, and counteract wasting of diverse origin.

As of 2012, oxandrolone was used in the treatment of idiopathic short stature, anemia, hereditary angioedema, hypogonadism and alcoholic hepatitis.

Medical research established the effectiveness of oxandrolone in aiding the development of girls with Turner syndrome. Although oxandrolone had long been used to accelerate growth in children with idiopathic short stature, it is unlikely to increase adult height, and in some cases may even decrease it; as such, as of 2015, oxandrolone has largely been replaced by growth hormone for this use. However, a 2019 Cochrane review comparing effects of adding oxandrolone to growth hormone treatment to growth hormone alone found moderate-quality evidence that the addition of oxandrolone led to an increase in final adult height of girls with Turner syndrome, and low-quality evidence showed no increase in adverse effects. When the same review assessed the effects of adding oxandrolone to growth hormone treatment on speech, cognition and psychological status, the results were inconclusive due to very-low quality evidence. Children with idiopathic short stature or Turner syndrome were given doses of oxandrolone far smaller than those given to people with burns.

Oxandrolone shows positive effects on cardiometabolic health and visual, motor, and psychosocial functions in adolescent males with preserved testosterone production, such as those with Klinefelter syndrome.

== Non-medical uses ==
Oxandrolone has been used illicitly by bodybuilders and athletes for its muscle-building effects as a doping agent in sports. Cases of doping with oxandrolone by professional athletes have been reported. Because it is more anabolic than androgenic, women and those seeking less intense steroid regimens used it particularly often. In the past many valued oxandrolone's supposed low hepatotoxicity relative to most other orally active AASs.

== Contraindications ==
Like other AASs, oxandrolone may worsen hypercalcemia by increasing osteolytic bone resorption. When taken by pregnant women, oxandrolone may have unintended effects such as masculinization on the fetus.

== Side effects ==
As of 2004, it was thought that "uniquely" among 17α-alkylated AASs, oxandrolone showed little to no hepatotoxicity, even at high doses. However, elevated liver enzymes have been observed in some people, particularly with high doses and/or prolonged treatment, although sometimes returning to normal ranges following discontinuation. However, there have been documented severe cases of peliosis hepatis, sometimes associated with liver failure and intra-abdominal hemorrhage; liver tumors, sometimes fatal; and blood lipid changes associated with increased risk of atherosclerosis. This led the FDA to remove approval in June 2023. Additional warnings include the risks associated with cholestatic hepatitis, hypercalcemia in patients with breast cancer, and increased risk for the development of prostatic hypertrophy and prostatic carcinoma in older patients.

Women who are administered oxandrolone may experience virilization, irreversible development of masculine features such as voice deepening, hirsutism, menstruation abnormalities, male-pattern hair loss, and clitoral enlargement. Because of these side effects, doses given to women and children are minimized and people are usually monitored for virilization and growth abnormalities. Like other androgens, oxandrolone can cause or worsen acne and priapism (unwanted or prolonged erections). Oxandrolone can also reduce males' fertility, another side effect common among androgens. In an attempt to compensate for the exogenous increase in androgens, the body may reduce testosterone production via testicular atrophy and inhibition of gonadotropic activity.

Unlike some AASs, oxandrolone does not generally cause gynecomastia because it is not aromatized into estrogenic metabolites. However, although no reports of gynecomastia were made in spite of widespread use, oxandrolone was reported in a publication in 1991 to have been associated with 33 cases of gynecomastia in adolescent boys treated with it for short stature. The gynecomastia developed during oxandrolone therapy in 19 of the boys and after the therapy was completed in 14 of the boys, and 10 of the boys had transient gynecomastia, while 23 had persistent gynecomastia that necessitated mastectomy. Though transient gynecomastia is a natural and common occurrence in pubertal boys, the gynecomastia associated with oxandrolone was of a late/delayed onset and was persistent in a high percentage of the cases. As such, the researchers stated, "although oxandrolone cannot be implicated as stimulatory [in] gynecomastia", a possible relationship should be considered in clinicians using oxandrolone in adolescents for growth stimulation.

== Drug-drug interactions ==
As of 2004 it was known that oxandrolone greatly increases warfarin's blood-thinning effect, sometimes dangerously so. In April 2004, Savient Pharmaceuticals published a safety alert through the FDA warning healthcare professionals of this. Oxandrolone also inhibits the metabolism of oral hypoglycemic agents. It may worsen edema when taken alongside corticosteroids or adrenocorticotropic hormone.

== Pharmacology ==
=== Pharmacodynamics ===
Androgenic vs. anabolic activity ratio of androgens/anabolic steroids
Medication	Ratio^{a}
Testosterone	~1:1
Androstanolone (DHT)	~1:1
Methyltestosterone	~1:1
Methandriol	~1:1
Fluoxymesterone	1:1–1:15
Metandienone	1:1–1:8
Drostanolone	1:3–1:4
Metenolone	1:2–1:3
Oxymetholone	1:2–1:9
Oxandrolone	1:13–1:3
Stanozolol	1:1–1:3
Nandrolone	1:3–1:16
Ethylestrenol	1:2–1:19
Norethandrolone	1:1–1:2
Notes: In rodents. Footnotes: ^{a} = Ratio of androgenic to anabolic activity. Sources: See template.

Like other AASs, oxandrolone is an agonist of the androgen receptor, similar to androgens such as testosterone and DHT. The relative binding affinity of oxandrolone for the androgen receptor is about 0.3% of that of metribolone. Activation of the androgen receptor stimulates protein synthesis, which increases muscle growth, lean body mass, and bone mineral density.

Compared to testosterone and many other AASs, oxandrolone is less androgenic relative to its strength as an anabolic. Oxandrolone has as much as six times the anabolic potency of testosterone and has significantly reduced androgenic potency in comparison: oxandrolone exhibits significantly lower virilizing androgenic properties compared to testosterone, with a relative androgenic potency of only 5%.

Compared to methyltestosterone, oxandrolone has about 322 to 633% of the anabolic potency and 24% of the androgenic potency.

The reduced ratio of anabolic to androgenic activity of oxandrolone motivated its medical use in children and women because less androgenic effect implies less risk of virilization. The bodybuilding community also considers this fact when choosing between AASs.

As of 2003 and 2011 Oxandrolone was thought to be "uniquely" far less hepatotoxic than other 17α-alkylated AASs, which was thought to be due to differences in metabolism. This turned out not to be the case in the long run, which is why it was taken off the US market in 2023.

=== Steroid configuration ===
Numbering of carbon atoms up to position 17 in a hypothetical steroid nucleus

Oxandrolone chemical formula structure

Oxandrolone is based on the tetracyclic steroid framework, which consists of three cyclohexane rings (A, B, and C) and one cyclopentane ring (D). This framework is a common structure shared by all steroids.

The oxygen atom in the lactone bridge replaces a carbon atom at position 2 of the steroid nucleus, classifying oxandrolone as a 2-oxa-steroid. There is a hydroxyl group (-OH) attached at stereo-direction β to carbon 17, which is a characteristic of 17β-hydroxy-steroids.

The overall structure of oxandrolone is distinguished by these modifications to the standard steroid nucleus, which contribute to its unique properties as an anabolic steroid. The lactone bridge, i.e., the 2-oxa-steroid classification, is not commonly found in the steroid family. This structural element is what gives oxandrolone its distinctive chemical identity within the class of anabolic steroids. Due to its lactone bridge, oxandrolone is resistant to inactivation by 3α-hydroxysteroid dehydrogenase in skeletal muscle. This resistance, in contrast to DHT, is believed to underlie oxandrolone's preserved anabolic potency

As oxandrolone is already a 5α-reduced steroid (has a single bond between carbons 4 and 5), it is not a substrate for the 5α-reductase enzyme, hence is not potentiated in androgenic tissues such as the skin, hair follicles, and prostate gland. In addition, the 5α-reduced state preserves oxandrolone from being a substrate for the aromatase enzyme; therefore, oxandrolone cannot be aromatized into metabolites with estrogenic activity. Oxandrolone similarly possesses no progestogenic activity.

=== Pharmacokinetics ===
The oral bioavailability of oxandrolone is 97%. Its plasma protein binding is 94 to 97%. The drug is metabolized primarily by the kidneys and to a lesser extent by the liver. Oxandrolone is the only AAS that is not primarily or extensively metabolized by the liver, and this is thought to be related to its diminished hepatotoxicity relative to other AASs. Its elimination half-life is reported as 9.4 to 10.4 hours, but is extended to 13.3 hours in the elderly. About 28% of an oral dose of oxandrolone is eliminated unchanged in the urine and 3% is excreted in the feces.

== Chemistry ==
Oxandrolone is a synthetic androstane steroid and a 17α-alkylated derivative of DHT. It is also known as 2-oxa-17α-methyl-5α-dihydrotestosterone (2-oxa-17α-methyl-DHT) or as 2-oxa-17α-methyl-5α-androstan-17β-ol-3-one, and is DHT with a methyl group at the C17α position and the C2 carbon replaced with an oxygen atom. Closely related AASs include the marketed AAS mestanolone (17α-methyl-DHT), oxymetholone (2-hydroxymethylene-17α-methyl-DHT), and stanozolol (a 2,3-pyrazole A ring-fused derivative of 17α-methyl-DHT) and the never-marketed/designer AAS desoxymethyltestosterone (3-deketo-17α-methyl-δ^{2}-DHT), methasterone (2α,17α-dimethyl-DHT), methyl-1-testosterone (17α-methyl-δ^{1}-DHT), and methylstenbolone (2,17α-dimethyl-δ^{1}-DHT).

== History ==
Oxandrolone was first made by Raphael Pappo and Christopher J. Jung while at Searle Laboratories, now part of Pfizer and they first described the drug in 1962. They were immediately interested in oxandrolone's very weak androgenic effects relative to its anabolic effects. It was introduced as a pharmaceutical drug in the United States in 1964.

Oxandrolone was prescribed to promote muscle regrowth in disorders which cause involuntary weight loss, and is used as part of treatment for HIV/AIDS. It had also been shown to be partially successful in treating cases of osteoporosis. However, in 1989, in part due to bad publicity from its illicit use by bodybuilders, production of Anavar was discontinued by Searle Laboratories. It was picked up by Bio-Technology General Corporation, which changed its name to Savient Pharmaceuticals. In 1995, following successful clinical trials, Savient released it under the brand name Oxandrin. As of 2011 BTG subsequently had won approvals for orphan drug status by the Food and Drug Administration for treating alcoholic hepatitis, Turner syndrome, and HIV-induced weight loss and as an offset to protein catabolism caused by long-term administration of corticosteroids.

== Society and culture ==
=== Generic names ===
Oxandrolone is the generic name of the drug and its INN, USAN, USP, BAN, DCF, DCIT, and JAN, while ossandrolone is or was formerly the DCIT.

=== Brand names ===
The original brand name of oxandrolone was Anavar, which was marketed in the United States and the Netherlands. This product was eventually discontinued and replaced in the United States with a new name of Oxandrin, which as of 2011 was the sole remaining brand name for oxandrolone in the United States. Oxandrolone has also been sold under the brand names Antitriol (Spain), Anatrophill (France), Lipidex (Brazil), Lonavar (Argentina, Australia, Italy), Protivar, and Vasorome (Japan), among others. As of 2016, among those using oxandrolone for nonmedical purposes, it has been referred to colloquially as "Var", a shortened form of the old brand name Anavar. Additional brand names existed for products that were manufactured for the steroid black market.

=== Availability ===
==== United States ====
As of 2017, Oxandrolone was one of the few AASs that remained available for medical use in the United States.

In June 2023, the FDA formally withdrew approval for oxandrolone for all indications, stating that possible adverse effects of the drug were sufficiently serious to warrant removal from the US market. The FDA decision was for reasons of safety or effectiveness, following a 2019 letter from Gemini, a drug manufacturer, stating that the product was no longer being marketed.

As of August 2023, the AASs that remained available for medical use in the US were testosterone, testosterone cypionate, testosterone enanthate, testosterone undecanoate, methyltestosterone, fluoxymesterone, and oxymetholone.

==== Other countries ====
Usually, the availability of oxandrolone is quite limited. It is no longer available in Europe. Oxandrolone is available in some less-regulated markets in Asia such as Malaysia and in Mexico.

Historically, oxandrolone has been marketed in Argentina, Australia, Brazil, France, Italy, Japan, and Spain, but it appears to no longer be available in these countries.

=== Legal status ===
In the United States, oxandrolone was categorized as a Schedule III controlled substance under the Controlled Substances Act along with many other AASs. In 2017, it was a Schedule IV controlled substance in Canada, and a Schedule 4 controlled drug in the United Kingdom.
