= Estradiol phenylpropionate =

Chemical compound

Clinical data
- Trade names: Menformon Prolongatum, Dimenformon Prolongatum, Lynandron Prolongatum
- Other names: Estradiol phenpropionate; Estradiol benzenepropionate; Estradiol phenylpropanoate; Estradiol benzenepropanoate
- Routes of administration: Intramuscular injection
- Drug class: Estrogen; Estrogen ester

Identifiers
- IUPAC name: [(8R,9S,13S,14S,17S)-3-Hydroxy-13-methyl-6,7,8,9,11,12,14,15,16,17-decahydrocyclopenta[a]phenanthren-17-yl] 3-phenylpropanoate
- CAS Number: 26443-03-8
- PubChem CID: 68577
- ChemSpider: 61847
- UNII: LS956OGN6U
- ChEMBL: ChEMBL1974118
- CompTox Dashboard (EPA): DTXSID00181040
- ECHA InfoCard: 100.043.340

Chemical and physical data
- Formula: C_{27}H_{32}O_{3}
- Molar mass: 404.550 g·mol^{−1}
- 3D model (JSmol): Interactive image
- SMILES: CC12CCC3C(C1CCC2OC(=O)CCC4=CC=CC=C4)CCC5=C3C=CC(=C5)O
- InChI: InChI=1S/C27H32O3/c1-27-16-15-22-21-11-9-20(28)17-19(21)8-10-23(22)24(27)12-13-25(27)30-26(29)14-7-18-5-3-2-4-6-18/h2-6,9,11,17,22-25,28H,7-8,10,12-16H2,1H3/t22-,23-,24+,25+,27+/m1/s1; Key:LQWSQQKTZLDGME-RYIFMDQWSA-N

Estradiol phenylpropionate (EPP), also known as estradiol 17β-phenylpropionate and sold under the brand name Menformon Prolongatum, is an estrogen which is no longer marketed. It is an estrogen ester, specifically the C17β phenylpropionate ester of estradiol.

EPP has been marketed in combination with estradiol benzoate under the brand name Dimenformon Prolongatum in Europe and in combination with estradiol benzoate, testosterone propionate, testosterone phenylpropionate, and testosterone isocaproate under the brand names Mixogen, Estandron Prolongatum, and Lynandron Prolongatum (a balanced mixture of estradiol and testosterone esters) in menopausal hormone therapy. Both of these medication combinations are long-acting injectables indicated in hormone replacement therapy for women in menopause. Dimenformon Prolongatum has also been investigated as a single injection, "morning after" post-coital contraceptive, and is additionally used as a component of hormone replacement therapy for transgender women.

The pharmacokinetics of EPP in combination with estradiol benzoate have been studied.

== See also ==
- List of estrogen esters § Estradiol esters
- Estradiol benzoate/estradiol phenylpropionate/testosterone propionate/testosterone phenylpropionate/testosterone isocaproate
- Estradiol benzoate/estradiol phenylpropionate
