= Methylestradiol =

Chemical compound

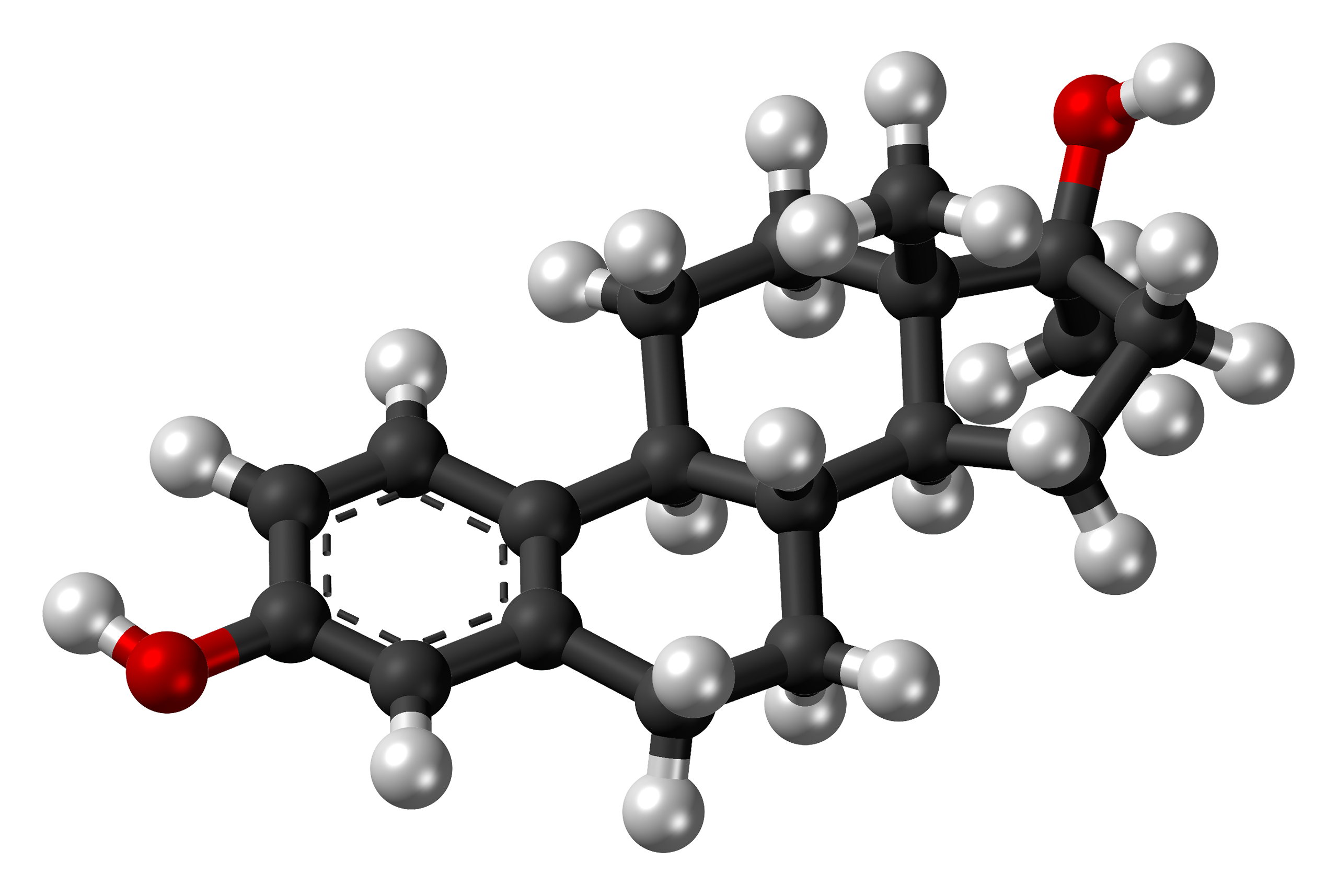

Clinical data
- Trade names: Ginecosid, Ginecoside, Mediol, Renodiol
- Other names: NSC-52245; 17α-Methylestradiol; 17α-ME; 17α-Methylestra-1,3,5(10)-triene-3,17β-diol
- Routes of administration: By mouth
- Drug class: Estrogen

Identifiers
- IUPAC name: (8R,9S,13S,14S,17S)-13,17-dimethyl-7,8,9,11,12,14,15,16-octahydro-6H-cyclopenta[a]phenanthrene-3,17-diol
- CAS Number: 302-76-1
- PubChem CID: 66413
- ChemSpider: 59787
- UNII: 08IS5358PS
- KEGG: C14483
- ChEBI: CHEBI:34179
- ChEMBL: ChEMBL1627631
- CompTox Dashboard (EPA): DTXSID401016541
- ECHA InfoCard: 100.005.572

Chemical and physical data
- Formula: C_{19}H_{26}O_{2}
- Molar mass: 286.415 g·mol^{−1}
- 3D model (JSmol): Interactive image
- SMILES: CC12CCC3C(C1CCC2(C)O)CCC4=C3C=CC(=C4)O
- InChI: InChI=1S/C19H26O2/c1-18-9-7-15-14-6-4-13(20)11-12(14)3-5-16(15)17(18)8-10-19(18,2)21/h4,6,11,15-17,20-21H,3,5,7-10H2,1-2H3/t15-,16-,17+,18+,19+/m1/s1; Key:JXQJDYXWHSVOEF-GFEQUFNTSA-N

Methylestradiol, sold under the brand names Ginecosid, Ginecoside, Mediol, and Renodiol, is an estrogen medication which is used in the treatment of menopausal symptoms. It is formulated in combination with normethandrone, a progestin and androgen/anabolic steroid medication. Methylestradiol is taken by mouth.

Side effects of methylestradiol include nausea, breast tension, edema, and breakthrough bleeding among others. It is an estrogen, or an agonist of the estrogen receptors, the biological target of estrogens like estradiol.

Methylestradiol is or has been marketed in Brazil, Venezuela, and Indonesia. In addition to its use as a medication, methylestradiol has been studied for use as a radiopharmaceutical for the estrogen receptor.

== Medical uses ==
Methylestradiol is used in combination with the progestin and androgen/anabolic steroid normethandrone (methylestrenolone) in the treatment of menopausal symptoms.

=== Available forms ===
Methylestradiol is marketed in combination with normethandrone in the form of oral tablets containing 0.3 mg methylestradiol and 5 mg normethandrone.

== Side effects ==
Side effects of methylestradiol include nausea, breast tension, edema, and breakthrough bleeding.

== Pharmacology ==
=== Pharmacodynamics ===
Methylestradiol is an estrogen, or an agonist of the estrogen receptor. It shows somewhat lower affinity for the estrogen receptor than estradiol or ethinylestradiol.

Methylestradiol is an active metabolite of the androgens/anabolic steroids methyltestosterone (17α-methyltestosterone), metandienone (17α-methyl-δ^{1}-testosterone), and normethandrone (17α-methyl-19-nortestosterone), and is responsible for their estrogenic side effects, such as gynecomastia and fluid retention.

Relative affinities (%) of methylestradiol and related steroids
Compound	PR	AR	ER	GR	MR	SHBG	CBG
Estradiol	2.6	7.9	100	0.6	0.13	8.7	<0.1
Ethinylestradiol	15–25	1–3	112	1–3	<1	?	?
Methylestradiol	3–10, 15–25	1–3	67	1–3	<1	?	?
Methyltestosterone	3	45, 100–125	?	1–5	?	5	?
Normethandrone	100	146	<0.1	1.5	0.6	?	?
Sources: Values are percentages (%). Reference ligands (100%) were progesterone for the PR, testosterone for the AR, E2 for the ER, DEXA for the GR, aldosterone for the MR, DHT for SHBG, and cortisol for CBG. Sources:

=== Pharmacokinetics ===
Due to the presence of its C17α methyl group, methylestradiol cannot be deactivated by oxidation of the C17β hydroxyl group, resulting in improved metabolic stability and potency relative to estradiol. This is analogous to the case of ethinylestradiol and its C17α ethynyl group.

== Chemistry ==
Methylestradiol, or 17α-methylestradiol (17α-ME), also known as 17α-methylestra-1,3,5(10)-triene-3,17β-diol, is a synthetic estrane steroid and a derivative of estradiol. It is specifically the derivative of estradiol with a methyl group at the C17α positions. Closely related steroids include ethinylestradiol (17α-ethynylestradiol) and ethylestradiol (17α-ethylestradiol). The C3 cyclopentyl ether of methylestradiol has been studied and shows greater oral potency than methylestradiol in animals, similarly to quinestrol (ethinylestradiol 3-cyclopentyl ether) and quinestradol (estriol 3-cyclopentyl ether).

=== Synthesis ===
The procedure involving organometallic addition of methyl lithium to estrone works in very high yield but not the Grignard reagent. The patent stated that methylestradiol has the advantage that it is orally much more active than estradiol.

== History ==
Methylestradiol was first marketed, alone as Follikosid and in combination with methyltestosterone as Klimanosid, in 1955.

== Society and culture ==
=== Generic names ===
Methylestradiol has not been assigned an INN or other formal name designations. Its generic name in English and German is methylestradiol, in French is méthylestradiol, and in Spanish is metilestadiol. It is also known as 17α-methylestradiol.

=== Brand names ===
Methylestradiol is or has been marketed under the brand names Ginecosid, Ginecoside, Mediol, and Renodiol, all in combination with normethandrone.

=== Availability ===
Methylestradiol is or has been marketed in Brazil, Venezuela, and Indonesia.
