= Normethandrone =

Chemical compound

Clinical data
- Trade names: Metalutin, others
- Other names: Normetandrone; Methylestrenolone; Methyloestrenolone; Methylnortestosterone; Normethyltestosterone; Normethandrolone; Normethisterone; Methylnandrolone; NMT; 17α-Methyl-19-nortestosterone; 17α-Methylestr-4-en-17β-ol-3-one; P-6051; RU-598; NSC-10039
- Routes of administration: By mouth
- Drug class: Progestogen; Progestin; Androgen; Anabolic steroid
- ATC code: G03DC31 (WHO)

Identifiers
- IUPAC name: (8R,9S,10R,13S,14S,17S)-17-hydroxy-13,17-dimethyl-1,2,6,7,8,9,10,11,12,14,15,16-dodecahydrocyclopenta[a]phenanthren-3-one
- CAS Number: 514-61-4
- PubChem CID: 5284597
- ChemSpider: 4447645
- UNII: 743F1Z557A
- KEGG: C14491
- ChEMBL: ChEMBL269549
- CompTox Dashboard (EPA): DTXSID4023383
- ECHA InfoCard: 100.007.440

Chemical and physical data
- Formula: C_{19}H_{28}O_{2}
- Molar mass: 288.431 g·mol^{−1}
- 3D model (JSmol): Interactive image
- SMILES: C[C@]12CC[C@H]3[C@H]([C@@H]1CC[C@]2(C)O)CCC4=CC(=O)CC[C@H]34
- InChI: InChI=1S/C19H28O2/c1-18-9-7-15-14-6-4-13(20)11-12(14)3-5-16(15)17(18)8-10-19(18,2)21/h11,14-17,21H,3-10H2,1-2H3/t14-,15+,16+,17-,18-,19-/m0/s1; Key:ZXSWTMLNIIZPET-ZOFHRBRSSA-N

Normethandrone, also known as methylestrenolone or methylnortestosterone and sold under the brand name Metalutin among others, is a progestin and androgen/anabolic steroid (AAS) medication which is used in combination with an estrogen in the treatment of amenorrhea and menopausal symptoms in women. It is taken by mouth.

Side effects of normethandrone include symptoms of masculinization like acne, increased hair growth, voice changes, and increased sexual desire. It can also cause liver damage. Normethandrone is a progestin, or a synthetic progestogen, and hence is an agonist of the progesterone receptor, the biological target of progestogens like progesterone. It is also a synthetic AAS and hence is an agonist of the androgen receptor, the biological target of androgens like testosterone and dihydrotestosterone (DHT). It has some estrogenic activity as well and no other important hormonal activity.

Normethandrone was introduced for medical use by 1957. It is available only in a few countries, including Brazil, Indonesia, and Venezuela, and is available only in combination with methylestradiol or estradiol valerate.

== Medical uses ==
Normethandrone is used in combination with an estrogen, either methylestradiol or estradiol valerate, in the treatment of amenorrhea and menopausal symptoms in women. It has also been used to treat dysmenorrhea in women. Normethandrone has been used successfully to inhibit libido in men with sexual deviance. Although normethandrone can be classified as an AAS and has strong such effects at sufficiently high doses, it is not typically used as such and is instead used medically only as a progestin. This is because it is so highly progestogenic in comparison.

Androgen replacement therapy formulations and dosages used in women
| Route | Medication | Major brand names | Form | Dosage |
|---|---|---|---|---|
| Oral | Testosterone undecanoate | Andriol, Jatenzo | Capsule | 40–80 mg 1x/1–2 days |
| Oral | Methyltestosterone | Metandren, Estratest | Tablet | 0.5–10 mg/day |
| Oral | Fluoxymesterone | Halotestin | Tablet | 1–2.5 mg 1x/1–2 days |
| Oral | Normethandrone^{a} | Ginecoside | Tablet | 5 mg/day |
| Oral | Tibolone | Livial | Tablet | 1.25–2.5 mg/day |
| Oral | Prasterone (DHEA)^{b} | – | Tablet | 10–100 mg/day |
| Sublingual | Methyltestosterone | Metandren | Tablet | 0.25 mg/day |
| Transdermal | Testosterone | Intrinsa | Patch | 150–300 μg/day |
| Transdermal | Testosterone | AndroGel | Gel, cream | 1–10 mg/day |
| Vaginal | Prasterone (DHEA) | Intrarosa | Insert | 6.5 mg/day |
| Injection | Testosterone propionate^{a} | Testoviron | Oil solution | 25 mg 1x/1–2 weeks |
| Injection | Testosterone enanthate | Delatestryl, Primodian Depot | Oil solution | 25–100 mg 1x/4–6 weeks |
| Injection | Testosterone cypionate | Depo-Testosterone, Depo-Testadiol | Oil solution | 25–100 mg 1x/4–6 weeks |
| Injection | Testosterone isobutyrate^{a} | Femandren M, Folivirin | Aqueous suspension | 25–50 mg 1x/4–6 weeks |
| Injection | Mixed testosterone esters | Climacteron^{a} | Oil solution | 150 mg 1x/4–8 weeks |
| Injection | Mixed testosterone esters | Omnadren, Sustanon | Oil solution | 50–100 mg 1x/4–6 weeks |
| Injection | Nandrolone decanoate | Deca-Durabolin | Oil solution | 25–50 mg 1x/6–12 weeks |
| Injection | Prasterone enanthate^{a} | Gynodian Depot | Oil solution | 200 mg 1x/4–6 weeks |
| Implant | Testosterone | Testopel | Pellet | 50–100 mg 1x/3–6 months |
Notes: Premenopausal women produce about 230 ± 70 μg testosterone per day (6.4 ± 2.0 mg testosterone per 4 weeks), with a range of 130 to 330 μg per day (3.6–9.2 mg per 4 weeks). Footnotes: ^{a} = Mostly discontinued or unavailable. ^{b} = Over-the-counter. Sources: See template.

Androgen/anabolic steroid dosages for breast cancer
| Route | Medication | Form | Dosage |
|---|---|---|---|
| Oral | Methyltestosterone | Tablet | 30–200 mg/day |
| Oral | Fluoxymesterone | Tablet | 10–40 mg 3x/day |
| Oral | Calusterone | Tablet | 40–80 mg 4x/day |
| Oral | Normethandrone | Tablet | 40 mg/day |
| Buccal | Methyltestosterone | Tablet | 25–100 mg/day |
| Injection (IM or SC) | Testosterone propionate | Oil solution | 50–100 mg 3x/week |
| Injection (IM or SC) | Testosterone enanthate | Oil solution | 200–400 mg 1x/2–4 weeks |
| Injection (IM or SC) | Testosterone cypionate | Oil solution | 200–400 mg 1x/2–4 weeks |
| Injection (IM or SC) | Mixed testosterone esters | Oil solution | 250 mg 1x/week |
| Injection (IM or SC) | Methandriol | Aqueous suspension | 100 mg 3x/week |
| Injection (IM or SC) | Androstanolone (DHT) | Aqueous suspension | 300 mg 3x/week |
| Injection (IM or SC) | Drostanolone propionate | Oil solution | 100 mg 1–3x/week |
| Injection (IM or SC) | Metenolone enanthate | Oil solution | 400 mg 3x/week |
| Injection (IM or SC) | Nandrolone decanoate | Oil solution | 50–100 mg 1x/1–3 weeks |
| Injection (IM or SC) | Nandrolone phenylpropionate | Oil solution | 50–100 mg/week |
Note: Dosages are not necessarily equivalent. Sources: See template.

=== Available forms ===
Normethandrone is marketed in combination with methylestradiol in the form of oral tablets containing 5 mg normethandrone and 0.3 mg methylestradiol.

== Side effects ==
Normethandrone has been associated with symptoms of masculinization and hepatotoxicity.

== Pharmacology ==
=== Pharmacodynamics ===
Normethandrone shows high progestogenic activity. With sublingual administration in women, it has at least 150 times the potency of sublingual progesterone and 50 times the potency of sublingual ethisterone. It also has 10 times the potency of injected progesterone via this route. The oral potency of normethandrone in terms of endometrial transformation is similar to that of norethisterone. It has been reported to inhibit ovulation in women.

In addition to its progestogenic activity, normethandrone has anabolic and androgenic activity and can produce effects associated with this activity. It has a high ratio of anabolic to androgenic activity. The anabolic potency of normethandrone is similar to that of norethandrolone and is much greater than that of nandrolone or metandienone. It is also greater than that of ethylestrenol. Normethandrone has been found to increase nitrogen retention, a measure of anabolic effect, at a dosage of 30 mg/day. Analogously to nandrolone and norethandrolone, 5α-dihydronormethandrone, the 5α-reduced metabolite of normethandrone, shows reduced affinity for the androgen receptor relative to normethandrone. Its affinity for the androgen receptor is specifically about 33 to 60% of that of normethandrone.

Normethandrone has estrogenic activity via aromatization into methylestradiol.

Relative affinities (%) of normethandrone and metabolites
| Compound | PR | AR | ER | GR | MR | SHBG | CBG |
|---|---|---|---|---|---|---|---|
| Normethandrone | 75–125 | 125–150 | <1 | 1–5 | <1 | ? | ? |
| 5α-Dihydronormethandrone | 15–25 | 50–75 | ? | <1 | ? | ? | ? |
Notes: Values are percentages (%). Reference ligands (100%) were progesterone for the PR, testosterone for the AR, estradiol for the ER, dexamethasone for the GR, and aldosterone for the MR. Sources: See template.

=== Pharmacokinetics ===
Normethandrone is metabolized by aromatase into methylestradiol in small quantities, similarly to methyltestosterone and metandienone. The metabolites of normethandrone have not been well-studied, but 5α-dihydronormethandrone is a likely metabolite formed by 5α-reductase.

The pharmacokinetics of normethandrone have been reviewed.

== Chemistry ==
Normethandrone, also known as 17α-methyl-19-nortestosterone or as 17α-methylestr-4-en-17β-ol-3-one, is a synthetic estrane steroid and a 17α-alkylated derivative of nandrolone (19-nortestosterone; 19-NT). It is specifically the 17α-methyl derivative of nandrolone as well as the 17α-methyl variant of norethandrolone (17α-ethyl-19-NT) and norethisterone (17α-ethynyl-19-NT).

=== Synthesis ===
Chemical syntheses of normethandrone have been published.

See the mibolerone page for the improved synthesis. Precursor:

== History ==
Normethandrone has been marketed for medical use since 1957. The combination of normethandrone and methylestradiol was introduced by at least 1966.

== Society and culture ==
=== Generic names ===
Normethandrone has not been assigned an INN or other formal name designations. It is also known as methylestrenolone, methylnortestosterone, normethandrolone, and normethisterone.

=== Brand names ===
Brand names of normethandrone include Batynid, Ginecosid, Ginecoside, Gynomin, Lutenin, Matronal, Mediol, Metalutin, Methalutin, Orgasteron, Orosteron, and Renodiol.

=== Availability ===
Normethandrone is marketed in Brazil, Indonesia, and Venezuela in combination with methylestradiol or estradiol valerate.
