= Methyltestosterone =

Chemical compound

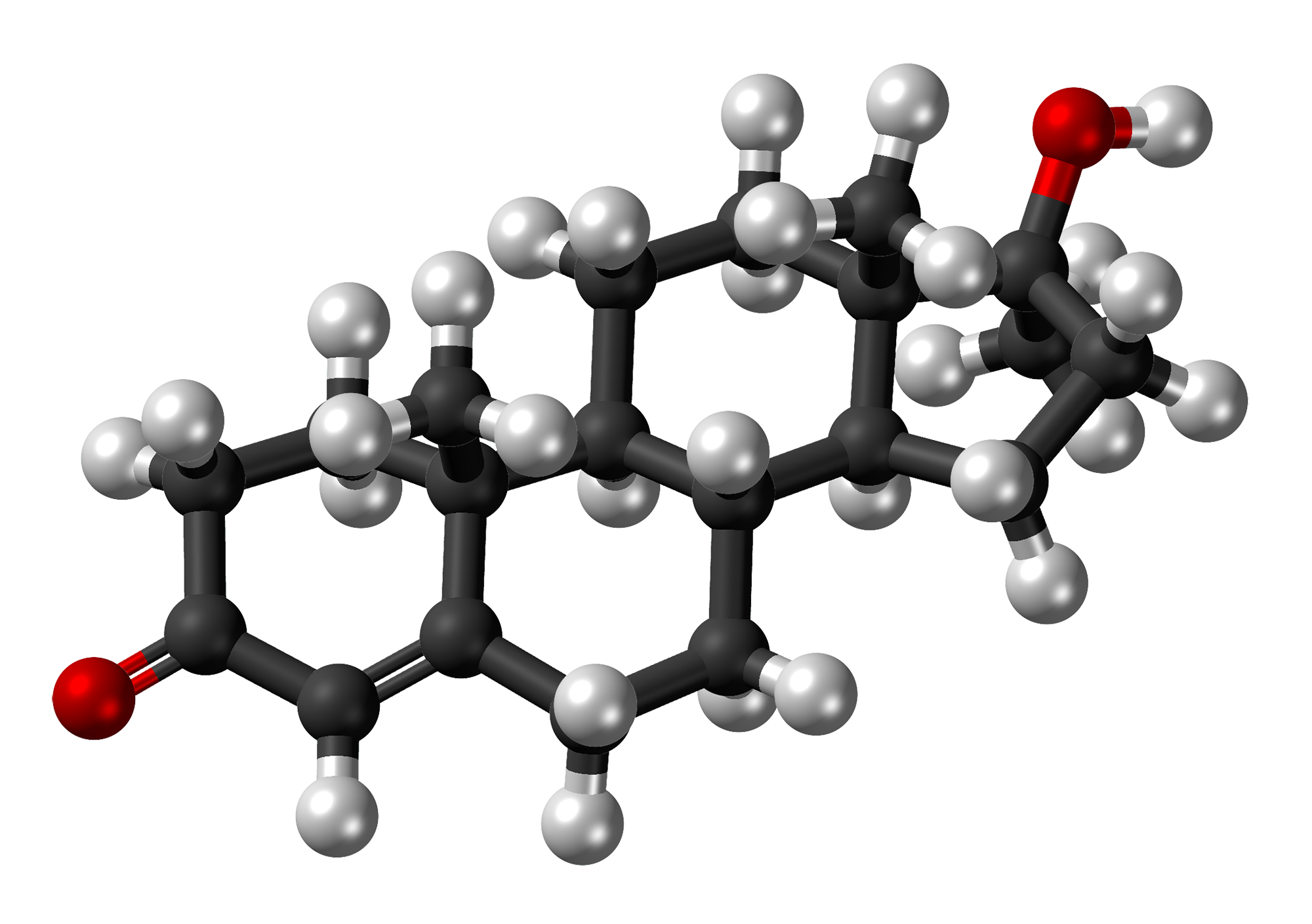

Clinical data
- Trade names: Agoviron, Android, Metandren, Oraviron, Oreton, Testovis, Testred, Virilon, others
- Other names: RU-24400; NSC-9701; 17α-Methyltestosterone; 17α-Methylandrost-4-en-17β-ol-3-one
- AHFS/Drugs.com: Monograph
- Pregnancy category: AU: D
- Routes of administration: By mouth, buccal, sublingual
- Drug class: Androgen; Anabolic steroid
- ATC code: G03BA02 (WHO) G03EK01 (WHO)

Legal status
- Legal status: AU: S4 (Prescription only); BR: Class C5 (Anabolic steroids); CA: Schedule IV; US: Schedule III; In general: ℞ (Prescription only)

Pharmacokinetic data
- Bioavailability: ~70%
- Protein binding: 98%
- Metabolism: Liver
- Elimination half-life: 150 minutes (~2.5–3 hours)
- Duration of action: 1–3 days
- Excretion: Urine: 90% Feces: 6%

Identifiers
- IUPAC name: (8R,9S,10R,13S,14S,17S)-17-hydroxy-10,13,17-trimethyl-2,6,7,8,9,11,12,14,15,16-decahydro-1H-cyclopenta[a]phenanthren-3-one
- CAS Number: 58-18-4
- PubChem CID: 6010
- IUPHAR/BPS: 6945
- DrugBank: DB06710
- ChemSpider: 5788
- UNII: V9EFU16ZIF
- KEGG: D00408
- ChEBI: CHEBI:6892
- ChEMBL: ChEMBL1395
- CompTox Dashboard (EPA): DTXSID1033664
- ECHA InfoCard: 100.000.333

Chemical and physical data
- Formula: C_{20}H_{30}O_{2}
- Molar mass: 302.458 g·mol^{−1}
- 3D model (JSmol): Interactive image
- SMILES: C[C@]12CCC(=O)C=C1CC[C@@H]3[C@@H]2CC[C@]4([C@H]3CC[C@]4(C)O)C
- InChI: InChI=1S/C20H30O2/c1-18-9-6-14(21)12-13(18)4-5-15-16(18)7-10-19(2)17(15)8-11-20(19,3)22/h12,15-17,22H,4-11H2,1-3H3/t15-,16+,17+,18+,19+,20+/m1/s1; Key:GCKMFJBGXUYNAG-HLXURNFRSA-N

Methyltestosterone, sold under the brand names Android, Metandren, and Testred among others, is an androgen and anabolic steroid (AAS) medication which is used in the treatment of low testosterone levels in men, delayed puberty in boys, at low doses as a component of hormone replacement therapy for menopausal symptoms such as hot flashes, osteoporosis, and low sexual desire in women, and to treat breast cancer in women. It is taken by mouth or held in the cheek or under the tongue.

Side effects of methyltestosterone include symptoms of masculinization like acne, increased hair growth, voice changes, and increased sexual desire. It can also cause estrogenic effects like fluid retention, breast tenderness, and breast enlargement in men and liver damage. The drug is a synthetic androgen and anabolic steroid and hence is an agonist of the androgen receptor (AR), the biological target of androgens like testosterone and dihydrotestosterone (DHT). It has moderate androgenic effects and moderate anabolic effects, which make it useful for producing masculinization.

Methyltestosterone was discovered in 1935 and was introduced for medical use in 1936. It was made shortly after the discovery of testosterone and was one of the first synthetic AAS to be developed. In addition to its medical use, methyltestosterone is used to improve physique and performance, although it is not as commonly used as other AAS for such purposes due to its androgenic effects, estrogenic effects, and risk of liver damage. The drug is a controlled substance in many countries and so non-medical use is generally illicit.

== Uses ==
=== Medical ===
Methyltestosterone is or has been used in the treatment of delayed puberty, hypogonadism, cryptorchidism, and erectile dysfunction in males, and in low doses to treat menopausal symptoms (specifically for osteoporosis, hot flashes, and to increase libido and energy), postpartum breast pain and engorgement, and breast cancer in women. It is specifically approved in the United States for the treatment of hypogonadism and delayed puberty in males and the treatment of advanced inoperable breast cancer in females. It was also approved in low doses in combination with esterified estrogens for the treatment of moderate to severe vasomotor symptoms associated with menopause in women in the United States, but this formulation was discontinued and hence is no longer used.

Methyltestosterone is less effective at inducing masculinization than testosterone, but is useful for maintaining established masculinization in adults.

The dosages of methyltestosterone used are 10 to 50 mg/day in men for common medical uses like hypogonadism and delayed puberty as well as physique- and performance-enhancing purposes and 2.5 mg/day in women for menopausal symptoms. Higher dosages of 50 to 200 mg/day have been used to treat women with inoperable breast cancer that has failed to respond to other therapies, although such dosages are associated with severe irreversible virilization.

Androgen replacement therapy formulations and dosages used in men
Route	Medication	Major brand names	Form	Dosage
Oral	Testosterone^{a}	–	Tablet	400–800 mg/day (in divided doses)
Oral	Testosterone undecanoate	Andriol, Jatenzo, Kyzatrex	Capsule	40–80 mg/2–4× day (with meals)
Oral	Methyltestosterone^{b}	Android, Metandren, Testred	Tablet	10–50 mg/day
Oral	Fluoxymesterone^{b}	Halotestin, Ora-Testryl, Ultandren	Tablet	5–20 mg/day
Oral	Metandienone^{b}	Dianabol	Tablet	5–15 mg/day
Oral	Mesterolone^{b}	Proviron	Tablet	25–150 mg/day
Sublingual	Testosterone^{b}	Testoral	Tablet	5–10 mg 1–4×/day
Sublingual	Methyltestosterone^{b}	Metandren, Oreton Methyl	Tablet	10–30 mg/day
Buccal	Testosterone	Striant	Tablet	30 mg 2×/day
Buccal	Methyltestosterone^{b}	Metandren, Oreton Methyl	Tablet	5–25 mg/day
Transdermal	Testosterone	AndroGel, Testim, TestoGel	Gel	25–125 mg/day
Transdermal	Testosterone	Androderm, AndroPatch, TestoPatch	Non-scrotal patch	2.5–15 mg/day
Transdermal	Testosterone	Testoderm	Scrotal patch	4–6 mg/day
Transdermal	Testosterone	Axiron	Axillary solution	30–120 mg/day
Transdermal	Androstanolone (DHT)	Andractim	Gel	100–250 mg/day
Rectal	Testosterone	Rektandron, Testosteron^{b}	Suppository	40 mg 2–3×/day
Injection (IM or SC)	Testosterone	Andronaq, Sterotate, Virosterone	Aqueous suspension	10–50 mg 2–3×/week
Injection (IM or SC)	Testosterone propionate^{b}	Testoviron	Oil solution	10–50 mg 2–3×/week
Injection (IM or SC)	Testosterone enanthate	Delatestryl	Oil solution	50–250 mg 1x/1–4 weeks
Injection (IM or SC)	Testosterone enanthate	Xyosted	Auto-injector	50–100 mg 1×/week
Injection (IM or SC)	Testosterone cypionate	Depo-Testosterone	Oil solution	50–250 mg 1x/1–4 weeks
Injection (IM or SC)	Testosterone isobutyrate	Agovirin Depot	Aqueous suspension	50–100 mg 1x/1–2 weeks
Injection (IM or SC)	Testosterone phenylacetate^{b}	Perandren, Androject	Oil solution	50–200 mg 1×/3–5 weeks
Injection (IM or SC)	Mixed testosterone esters	Sustanon 100, Sustanon 250	Oil solution	50–250 mg 1×/2–4 weeks
Injection (IM or SC)	Testosterone undecanoate	Aveed, Nebido	Oil solution	750–1,000 mg 1×/10–14 weeks
Injection (IM or SC)	Testosterone buciclate^{a}	–	Aqueous suspension	600–1,000 mg 1×/12–20 weeks
Implant	Testosterone	Testopel	Pellet	150–1,200 mg/3–6 months
Notes: Men produce about 3 to 11 mg of testosterone per day (mean 7 mg/day in young men). Footnotes: ^{a} = Never marketed. ^{b} = No longer used and/or no longer marketed. Sources: See template.

Androgen replacement therapy formulations and dosages used in women
Route	Medication	Major brand names	Form	Dosage
Oral	Testosterone undecanoate	Andriol, Jatenzo	Capsule	40–80 mg 1x/1–2 days
Oral	Methyltestosterone	Metandren, Estratest	Tablet	0.5–10 mg/day
Oral	Fluoxymesterone	Halotestin	Tablet	1–2.5 mg 1x/1–2 days
Oral	Normethandrone^{a}	Ginecoside	Tablet	5 mg/day
Oral	Tibolone	Livial	Tablet	1.25–2.5 mg/day
Oral	Prasterone (DHEA)^{b}	–	Tablet	10–100 mg/day
Sublingual	Methyltestosterone	Metandren	Tablet	0.25 mg/day
Transdermal	Testosterone	Intrinsa	Patch	150–300 μg/day
Transdermal	Testosterone	AndroGel	Gel, cream	1–10 mg/day
Vaginal	Prasterone (DHEA)	Intrarosa	Insert	6.5 mg/day
Injection	Testosterone propionate^{a}	Testoviron	Oil solution	25 mg 1x/1–2 weeks
Injection	Testosterone enanthate	Delatestryl, Primodian Depot	Oil solution	25–100 mg 1x/4–6 weeks
Injection	Testosterone cypionate	Depo-Testosterone, Depo-Testadiol	Oil solution	25–100 mg 1x/4–6 weeks
Injection	Testosterone isobutyrate^{a}	Femandren M, Folivirin	Aqueous suspension	25–50 mg 1x/4–6 weeks
Injection	Mixed testosterone esters	Climacteron^{a}	Oil solution	150 mg 1x/4–8 weeks
Injection	Mixed testosterone esters	Omnadren, Sustanon	Oil solution	50–100 mg 1x/4–6 weeks
Injection	Nandrolone decanoate	Deca-Durabolin	Oil solution	25–50 mg 1x/6–12 weeks
Injection	Prasterone enanthate^{a}	Gynodian Depot	Oil solution	200 mg 1x/4–6 weeks
Implant	Testosterone	Testopel	Pellet	50–100 mg 1x/3–6 months
Notes: Premenopausal women produce about 230 ± 70 μg testosterone per day (6.4 ± 2.0 mg testosterone per 4 weeks), with a range of 130 to 330 μg per day (3.6–9.2 mg per 4 weeks). Footnotes: ^{a} = Mostly discontinued or unavailable. ^{b} = Over-the-counter. Sources: See template.

Androgen/anabolic steroid dosages for breast cancer
Route	Medication	Form	Dosage
Oral	Methyltestosterone	Tablet	30–200 mg/day
Oral	Fluoxymesterone	Tablet	10–40 mg 3x/day
Oral	Calusterone	Tablet	40–80 mg 4x/day
Oral	Normethandrone	Tablet	40 mg/day
Buccal	Methyltestosterone	Tablet	25–100 mg/day
Injection (IM or SC)	Testosterone propionate	Oil solution	50–100 mg 3x/week
Injection (IM or SC)	Testosterone enanthate	Oil solution	200–400 mg 1x/2–4 weeks
Injection (IM or SC)	Testosterone cypionate	Oil solution	200–400 mg 1x/2–4 weeks
Injection (IM or SC)	Mixed testosterone esters	Oil solution	250 mg 1x/week
Injection (IM or SC)	Methandriol	Aqueous suspension	100 mg 3x/week
Injection (IM or SC)	Androstanolone (DHT)	Aqueous suspension	300 mg 3x/week
Injection (IM or SC)	Drostanolone propionate	Oil solution	100 mg 1–3x/week
Injection (IM or SC)	Metenolone enanthate	Oil solution	400 mg 3x/week
Injection (IM or SC)	Nandrolone decanoate	Oil solution	50–100 mg 1x/1–3 weeks
Injection (IM or SC)	Nandrolone phenylpropionate	Oil solution	50–100 mg/week
Note: Dosages are not necessarily equivalent. Sources: See template.

=== Non-medical ===
Methyltestosterone is used for physique- and performance-enhancing purposes by competitive athletes, bodybuilders, and powerlifters, although it is not commonly used relative to other AAS for such purposes.

=== Available forms ===
Methyltestosterone is typically used as an oral medication. It is also available under the brand names Metandren and Oreton Methyl for use specifically by buccal or sublingual administration. Methyltestosterone is available in the form of 2, 5, 10, and 25 mg oral tablets. It was also available in combination with estrogens as esterified estrogens/methyltestosterone (0.625 mg/1.25 mg, 1.25 mg/2.5 mg) and conjugated estrogens/methyltestosterone (0.625 mg/5.0 mg, 1.25 mg/10 mg).

== Contraindications ==
Methyltestosterone should be used with caution in women and children, as it can cause irreversible virilization. Due to its estrogenicity, methyltestosterone can also accelerate epiphyseal closure and thereby produce short stature in children and adolescents. It can worsen symptoms in men with benign prostatic hyperplasia. Methyltestosterone should not be used in men with prostate cancer, as androgens can accelerate tumor progression. The drug should be used with caution in patients with pre-existing hepatotoxicity, due to its own potential for hepatotoxicity.

== Side effects ==
Adverse effects of methyltestosterone include androgenic side effects like oily skin, acne, seborrhea, increased facial/body hair growth, scalp hair loss, increased aggressiveness and sex drive, and spontaneous erections, as well as estrogenic side effects like breast tenderness, gynecomastia, fluid retention, and edema. In women, methyltestosterone can cause partially irreversible virilization, for instance voice deepening, hirsutism, clitoromegaly, breast atrophy, and muscle hypertrophy, as well as menstrual disturbances and reversible infertility. In men, the drug may also cause hypogonadism, testicular atrophy, and reversible infertility at sufficiently high dosages.

Methyltestosterone can sometimes cause hepatotoxicity, for instance elevated liver enzymes, cholestatic jaundice, peliosis hepatis, hepatomas, and hepatocellular carcinoma, with extended use. It can also have adverse effects on the cardiovascular system. AAS like methyltestosterone stimulate erythropoiesis (red blood cell production) and increase hematocrit levels and at high dosages can cause polycythemia (overproduction of red blood cells), which can greatly increase the risk of thrombic events such as embolism and stroke. With long-term treatment, AAS can increase the risk of benign prostatic hyperplasia and prostate cancer. Violent and even homicidal behavior, hypomania/mania, depression, suicidality, delusions, and psychosis have all been associated with very high dosages of AAS.

== Interactions ==
Aromatase inhibitors can be used to reduce or prevent the estrogenic effects of methyltestosterone and 5α-reductase inhibitors can be used to reduce its virilizing effects and thereby improve its ratio of anabolic to androgenic activity and reduce its rate of androgenic side effects.

== Pharmacology ==
=== Pharmacodynamics ===
Androgenic vs. anabolic activity ratio of androgens/anabolic steroids
Medication	Ratio^{a}
Testosterone	~1:1
Androstanolone (DHT)	~1:1
Methyltestosterone	~1:1
Methandriol	~1:1
Fluoxymesterone	1:1–1:15
Metandienone	1:1–1:8
Drostanolone	1:3–1:4
Metenolone	1:2–1:3
Oxymetholone	1:2–1:9
Oxandrolone	1:13–1:3
Stanozolol	1:1–1:3
Nandrolone	1:3–1:16
Ethylestrenol	1:2–1:19
Norethandrolone	1:1–1:2
Notes: In rodents. Footnotes: ^{a} = Ratio of androgenic to anabolic activity. Sources: See template.

As an AAS, methyltestosterone is an agonist of the androgen receptor (AR), similarly to androgens like testosterone and dihydrotestosterone (DHT). It is a substrate for 5α-reductase like testosterone, and so is potentiated analogously in so-called "androgenic" tissues like the skin, hair follicles, and prostate gland via transformation into the more potent AR agonist mestanolone (17α-methyl-DHT). As such, methyltestosterone has a relatively low ratio of anabolic to androgenic activity, with a similar ratio to that of testosterone (close to 1:1), and this makes it among the most androgenic AAS. Due to efficient aromatization into the potent and metabolism-resistant estrogen methylestradiol (17α-methylestradiol), methyltestosterone has relatively high estrogenicity and hence potential for estrogenic side effects such as gynecomastia and fluid retention. The drug possesses negligible progestogenic activity.

Due to its combined disadvantages of a relatively poor ratio of anabolic to androgenic activity, unusually high estrogenicity, and the potential for hepatotoxicity (as with other 17α-alkylated AAS), methyltestosterone has not been used as commonly as many other AAS either in medicine or for physique- or performance-enhancing purposes.

=== Pharmacokinetics ===
==== Absorption ====
Methyltestosterone has dramatically improved oral bioavailability and metabolic stability relative to testosterone. This difference is due to the C17α methyl group, which results in steric hindrance and prevents metabolism. The oral bioavailability of methyltestosterone is about 70%, and it is well-absorbed from the gastrointestinal tract. Methyltestosterone can also be taken buccally or sublingually. Although effective orally, methyltestosterone is more effective by these non-oral routes, which are said to approximately double its bioavailability and require half the oral dosage.

Circulating levels of methyltestosterone with administration of 1.25 to 2.5 mg/day oral methyltestosterone in women are in the range of 20 to 30 ng/dL. For comparison to testosterone, methyltestosterone is at least as potent as an AAS. However, due to the large decrease in sex hormone-binding globulin (SHBG) levels and hence increase in free unbound testosterone caused by methyltestosterone, androgenic effects may be greater than reflected merely by methyltestosterone levels.

==== Distribution ====
Methyltestosterone is highly protein-bound, by approximately 98%. The medication has low but significant affinity for human serum sex hormone-binding globulin (SHBG), about 25% of that of testosterone and 5% of that of DHT.

==== Metabolism ====
The biological half-life of methyltestosterone is approximately 3 hours (range 2.5–3.5 hours). The duration of action of methyltestosterone is said to be 1 to 3 days, and is described as relatively short among AAS.

==== Excretion ====
Methyltestosterone is excreted 90% in the urine as conjugates and other metabolites, and 6% in feces.

== Chemistry ==
Methyltestosterone, also known as 17α-methyltestosterone or as 17α-methylandrost-4-en-17β-ol-3-one, is a synthetic, 17α-alkylated androstane steroid and a derivative of testosterone differing from it only in the presence of a methyl group at the C17α position. Close synthetic relatives of methyltestosterone include metandienone (17α-methyl-δ^{1}-testosterone) and fluoxymesterone (9α-fluoro-11β-hydroxy-17α-methyltestosterone).

=== Derivatives ===
Methyltestosterone and ethyltestosterone (17α-ethyltestosterone) are the parent structures of all 17α-alkylated AAS. Major 17α-alkylated AAS include the testosterone derivatives fluoxymesterone, metandienone (methandrostenolone), and methyltestosterone and the DHT derivatives oxandrolone, oxymetholone, and stanozolol.

=== Synthesis ===
A chemical synthesis of methyltestosterone from dehydroepiandrosterone (DHEA) with methandriol as an intermediate proceeds as follows:

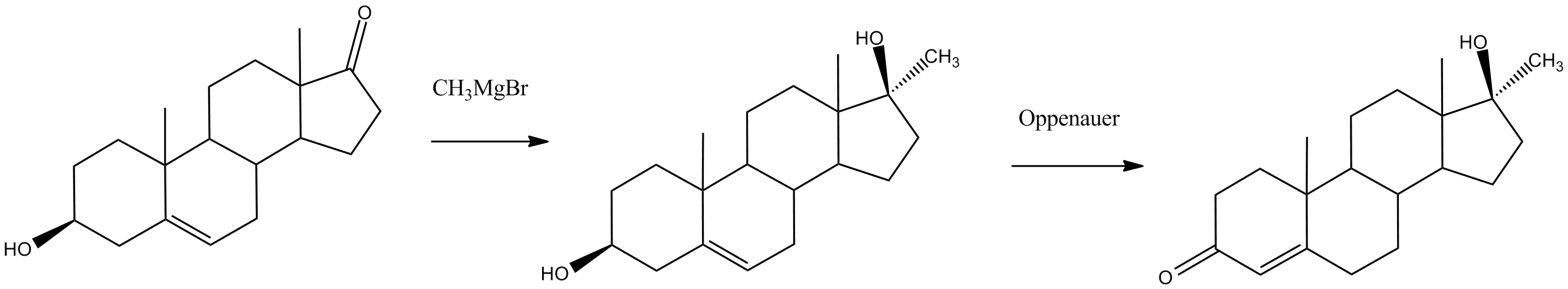

A newer synthesis was reported that uses Androstenedione as starting material:

== History ==
Methyltestosterone was first synthesized in 1935 along with methandriol and mestanolone. It was the second synthetic AAS to be developed, following mesterolone (1α-methyl-DHT) in 1934, and was the first 17α-alkylated AAS to be synthesized. The drug was introduced for medical use in 1936.

== Society and culture ==
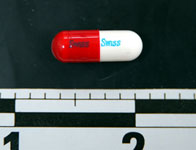
A confiscated capsule of illicit methyltestosterone.

=== Generic names ===
Methyltestosterone is the INN, USAN, USP, BAN, and JAN of the drug and its generic name in English and Japanese, while méthyltestostérone is its DCF and French name and metiltestosterone is its DCIT and Italian name. The generic name of the drug is methyltestosterone in Latin, methyltestosteron in German, and metiltestosterona in Spanish. Methyltestosterone is also known by its former developmental code name NSC-9701.

=== Brand names ===
Brand names under which methyltestosterone is or has been marketed for medical use include Afro, Agovirin, Android, Androral, Mesteron, Metandren, Methitest, Methyltestosterone, Methyl Testosterone, Oraviron, Oreton, Oreton Methyl, Testormon, Testovis, Testred, and Virilon, among others.

==== With an estrogen ====
Methyltestosterone is available at a low-dose in combination with esterified estrogens for the treatment of menopausal symptoms like hot flashes in women under the brand names Covaryx, Essian, Estratest, Menogen, and Syntest.

=== Availability ===
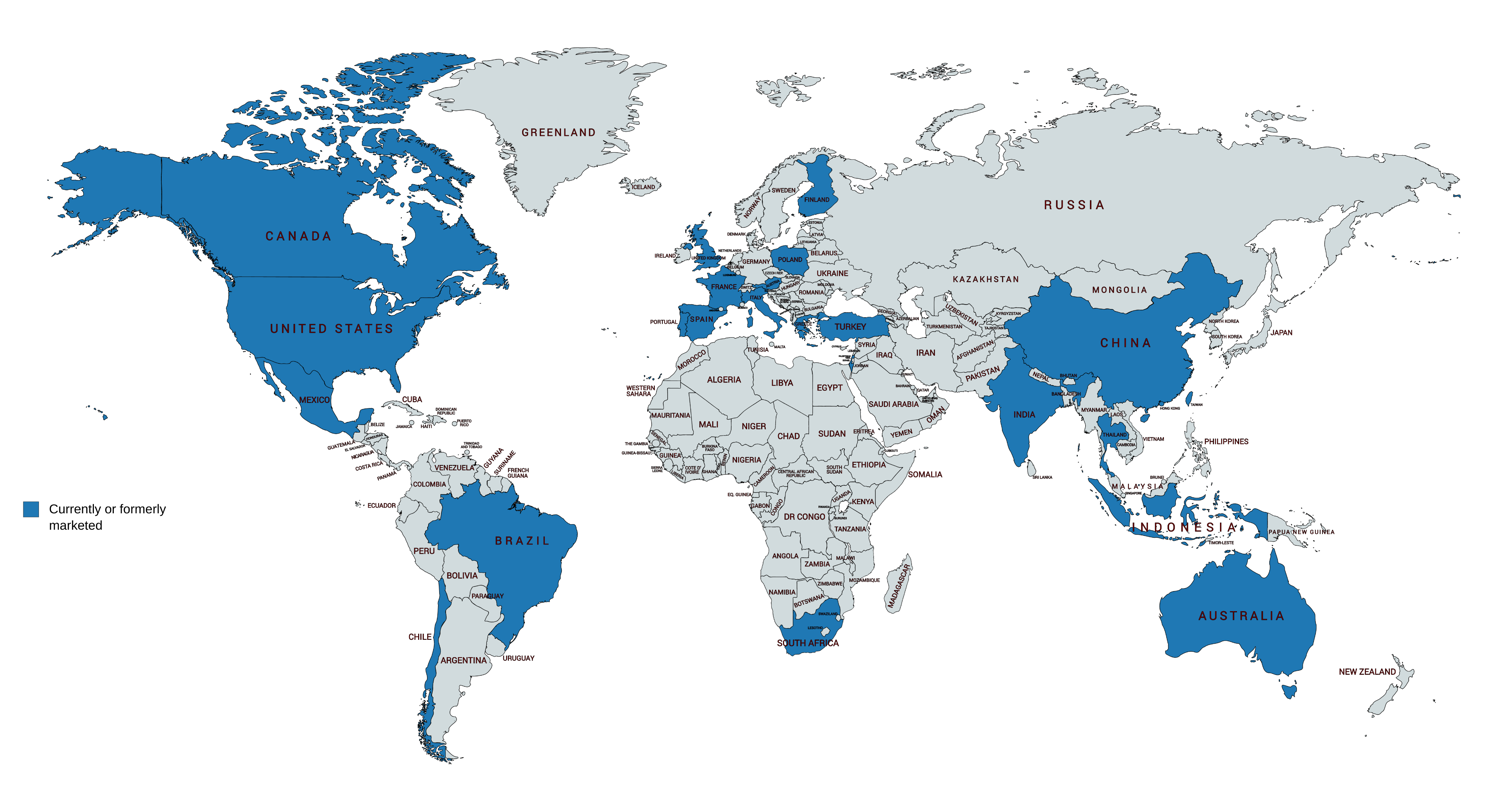
Availability of methyltestosterone in countries throughout the world. Blue is currently or formerly marketed.

==== United States ====
Although it is not commonly used, methyltestosterone is one of the few AAS that remains available for medical use in the United States. The others are testosterone, testosterone cypionate, testosterone enanthate, testosterone undecanoate, oxandrolone, oxymetholone, and fluoxymesterone.

==== Other countries ====
Methyltestosterone has also been marketed in many other countries throughout the world.

=== Legal status ===
Methyltestosterone, along with other AAS, is a schedule III controlled substance in the United States under the Controlled Substances Act and a schedule IV controlled substance in Canada under the Controlled Drugs and Substances Act.

== See also ==
- Esterified estrogens/methyltestosterone
- Conjugated estrogens/methyltestosterone
