= List of androgens and anabolic steroids =

Testosterone.

Steroid ring system.

This is a list of androgens/anabolic steroids (AAS) or testosterone derivatives. Androgen esters are mostly not included in this list. The major classes of testosterone derivatives include the following (as well as combinations thereof):

- Testosterone derivatives: direct derivatives of testosterone not falling into the groups below
- 4,5α-Reduced/dihydrogenated testosterone derivatives: dihydrotestosterone (DHT) derivatives
- 19-Demethylated testosterone derivatives: 19-nortestosterone (nandrolone) derivatives
- 17α-Alkylated testosterone derivatives: methyltestosterone and ethyltestosterone derivatives
- 17α-Ethynylated/vinylated testosterone derivatives: ethynyltestosterone (ethisterone) and vinyltestosterone derivatives

The last group consists of progestins with mostly only very weak androgenic/anabolic activity. AAS that are listed as marketed may be marketed as one or more esters rather than as the listed AAS itself.

This article pertains to steroidal androgens; nonsteroidal androgens like the selective androgen receptor modulators (SARMs) andarine and enobosarm (ostarine) are not included here.

== Natural/endogenous ==
- Marketed
  - Androstenediol (A5; 5-androstenediol)
  - Boldenone (δ^{1}-T)*
  - Dehydroepiandrosterone (DHEA; prasterone, 5-androstenolone)
  - Dihydrotestosterone (DHT; androstanolone, stanolone)
  - Nandrolone (19-NT; 19-nortestosterone)*
  - Testosterone (T; 4-androstenolone)
- Never marketed
  - 11-Ketodihydrotestosterone (11-KDHT)
  - 11-Ketotestosterone (11-KT)
  - 11β-Hydroxyandrostenedione (11β-OHA4)
  - 19-Nor-5-androstenediol (19-NA5)*
  - Adrenosterone (11-ketoandrostenedione; 11-KA4)
  - Androstenedione (A4; 4-androstenedione)
  - Androsterone
  - Bolandione (19-nor-4-androstenedione)*
  - Dehydroandrosterone (DHA; 5-dehydroandrosterone)
  - Epiandrosterone

* Only present endogenously in trace/very small amounts or present in other species.

== Testosterone derivatives ==
=== Non-17α-Alkylated ===
Compound	Chemical name	Structure	Marketed	Prohormone-like	Prodrug
Testosterone	Androst-4-en-17β-ol-3-one		✓	–	–
4-Hydroxytestosterone	4-Hydroxytestosterone		–	–	–
11-Ketotestosterone	11-Ketotestosterone		–	–	–
Boldenone	Δ^{1}-Testosterone		✓	–	–
Clostebol	4-Chlorotestosterone		✓	–	–
4-Androstenediol	4-Androstenediol		–	✓	–
4-Dehydroepiandrosterone (4-DHEA)	4-Dehydroepiandrosterone		–	✓	–
5-Androstenedione	5-Androstenedione		–	✓	–
5-Dehydroandrosterone (5-DHA)	5-Dehydroandrosterone		–	✓	–
11β-Hydroxyandrostenedione (11β-OHA4)	11β-Hydroxy-4-androstenedione		–	✓	–
Adrenosterone (11-ketoandrostenedione, 11-KA4)	11-Keto-4-androstenedione		–	✓	–
Androstenediol (5-androstenediol, A5)	5-Androstenediol		–	✓	–
Androstenedione (4-androstenedione, A4)	4-Androstenedione		–	✓	–
Atamestane	1-Methyl-δ^{1}-4-androstenedione		–	✓	–
Boldione (1,4-androstadienedione)	δ^{1}-4-Androstenedione		–	✓	–
Dehydroepiandrosterone (DHEA, 5-DHEA; prasterone, androstenolone)	5-Dehydroepiandrosterone		✓	✓	–
Exemestane	6-Methylidene-δ^{1}-4-androstenedione		✓	✓	–
Formestane	4-Hydroxy-4-androstenedione		✓	✓	–
Plomestane	10-Propargyl-4-androstenedione		–	✓	–
Cloxotestosterone	Testosterone 17-chloral hemiacetal ether		✓	–	✓
Quinbolone	Δ^{1}-Testosterone 17β-cyclopentenyl enol ether		✓	–	✓
Silandrone	Testosterone 17β-trimethylsilyl ether		–	–	✓

=== 17α-Alkylated ===
Compound	Chemical name	Structure	Marketed	Prohormone-like	Prodrug
Bolasterone	7α,17α-Dimethyltestosterone		✓	–	–
Calusterone	7β,17α-Dimethyltestosterone		✓	–	–
Chlorodehydromethyltestosterone (CDMT)	4-Chloro-17α-methyl-δ^{1}-testosterone		✓	–	–
Enestebol	4-Hydroxy-17α-methyl-δ^{1}-testosterone		–	–	–
Ethyltestosterone	17α-Ethyltestosterone		–	–	–
Fluoxymesterone	9α-Fluoro-11β-hydroxy-17α-methyltestosterone		✓	–	–
Formebolone	2-Formyl-11α-hydroxy-17α-methyl-δ^{1}-testosterone		✓	–	–
Hydroxystenozole	17α-Methyl-2'H-androsta-2,4-dieno[3,2-c]pyrazol-17β-ol		–	–	–
Metandienone (methandienone, methandrostenolone)	17α-Methyl-δ^{1}-testosterone		✓	–	–
Methylclostebol (chloromethyltestosterone)	4-Chloro-17α-methyltestosterone, (CMT		–	–	–
Methyltestosterone	17α-Methyltestosterone		✓	–	–
Oxymesterone	4-Hydroxy-17α-methyltestosterone		✓	–	–
Tiomesterone (thiomesterone)	1α,7α-Diacetylthio-17α-methyltestosterone		✓	–	–
Chlorodehydromethylandrostenediol (CDMA)	4-Chloro-17α-methyl-δ^{1}-4-androstenediol		–	✓	–
Chloromethylandrostenediol (CMA)	4-Chloro-17α-methyl-4-androstenediol		–	✓	–
Methandriol (methylandrostenediol)	17α-Methyl-5-androstenediol		✓	✓	–
Methyltestosterone 3-hexyl ether	17α-Methyl-4-hydro-δ^{3,5}-testosterone 3-hexyl ether^{?}		✓	–	✓
Penmesterol (penmestrol)	17α-Methyl-4-hydro-δ^{3,5}-testosterone 3-cyclopentyl ether^{?}		✓	–	✓

=== 17α-alkenyl and -alkynyl ===
Compound	Chemical name	Structure	Marketed
Vinyltestosterone	17α-Ethenyltestosterone		–
Ethisterone (ethinyltestosterone)	17α-Ethynyltestosterone		✓
Danazol (2,3-isoxazolethisterone)	2,3-Isoxazol-17α-ethynyltestosterone		✓

17α-Ethynylated testosterone derivatives are potent progestins with only very weak androgenic/anabolic activity and are used as oral contraceptives or for the treatment of gynecological conditions in women. They are invariably classified as progestins rather than as AAS. However, these progestins are testosterone derivatives and do have significant androgenic/anabolic activity, sometimes producing acne and other mild androgenic effects in women. Conversely, in men, these drugs may actually have functional antiandrogen effects due to their potent progestogenic and hence antigonadotropic activity and capacity to suppress gonadal testosterone production.

== Dihydrotestosterone derivatives ==
=== Non-17α-Alkylated ===
Compound	Chemical name	Structure	Marketed	Prohormone-like	Prodrug
Dihydrotestosterone (DHT); androstanolone, stanolone)	4,5α-Dihydrotestosterone		✓	–	–
1-Testosterone (dihydro-1-testosterone, dihydroboldenone)	4,5α-Dihydro-δ^{1}-testosterone		–	–	–
11-Ketodihydrotestosterone (11-KDHT)	11-Keto-4,5α-dihydrotestosterone		–	–	–
Drostanolone	2α-Methyl-4,5α-dihydrotestosterone		✓	–	–
Epitiostanol (epithioandrostanol)	2α,3α-Epithio-3-deketo-4,5α-dihydrotestosterone		✓	–	–
Mesterolone	1α-Methyl-4,5α-dihydrotestosterone		✓	–	–
Metenolone (methenolone, methylandrostenolone)	1-Methyl-4,5α-dihydro-δ^{1}-testosterone		✓	–	–
Nisterime	2α-Chloro-4,5α-dihydrotestosterone 3-O-(p-nitrophenyl)oxime		–	–	–
Stenbolone	2-Methyl-4,5α-dihydro-δ^{1}-testosterone		✓	–	–
1-Androsterone (1-Andro, 1-DHEA)	1-Dehydroepiandrosterone		–	✓	–
1-Androstenediol (dihydro-1-androstenediol)	1-Androstenediol (4,5α-dihydro-δ^{1}-4-androstenediol)		–	✓	–
1-Androstenedione (dihydro-1-androstenedione)	1-Androstenedione (4,5α-dihydro-δ^{1}-4-androstenedione)		–	✓	–
5α-Androst-2-en-17-one	3-Deketo-2-androstenedione (3-deketo-4,5α-dihydro-δ^{2}-4-androstenedione)		–	✓	–
Androsterone	Androsterone		–	✓	–
Epiandrosterone	Epiandrosterone		–	✓	–
Mepitiostane	2α,3α-Epithio-3-deketo-4,5α-dihydrotestosterone 17β-(1-methoxycyclopentane) ether		✓	–	✓
Mesabolone	4,5α-Dihydro-δ^{1}-testosterone 17β-(1-methoxycyclohexane) ether		–	–	✓
Prostanozol	2'H-5α-Androst-2-eno[3,2-c]pyrazol-17β-ol 17β-tetrahydropyran ether		–	–	✓
Bolazine (di(drostanolone) azine)	3,3-[(1E,2E)-1,2-Hydrazinediylidene]di(2α-methyl-5α-androstan-17β-ol)^{?}		✓	–	✓

=== 17α-Alkylated ===
Compound	Chemical name	Structure	Marketed	Prohormone-like	Prodrug
Androisoxazole	17α-Methyl-5α-androstano[3,2-c]isoxazol-17β-ol		✓	–	–
Desoxymethyltestosterone	3-Deketo-17α-methyl-4,5α-dihydro-δ^{2}-testosterone		–	–	–
Furazabol	17α-Methyl-5α-androstano[2,3-c][1,2,5]oxadiazol-17β-ol		✓	–	–
Mestanolone (methyl-DHT)	17α-Methyl-4,5α-dihydrotestosterone		✓	–	–
Methasterone (methyldrostanolone)	2α,17α-Dimethyl-4,5α-dihydrotestosterone		–	–	–
Methyl-1-testosterone (methyldihydro-1-testosterone, methyldihydroboldenone)	17α-Methyl-4,5α-dihydro-δ^{1}-testosterone		–	–	–
Methyldiazinol	3-Azi-17α-methyl-4,5α-dihydrotestosterone		–	–	–
Methylepitiostanol	2α,3α-Epithio-3-deketo-17α-methyl-4,5α-dihydrotestosterone		–	–	–
Methylstenbolone	2,17α-Dimethyl-4,5α-dihydro-δ^{1}-testosterone		–	–	–
Oxandrolone	2-Oxa-17α-methyl-4,5α-dihydrotestosterone		✓	–	–
Oxymetholone	2-Hydroxymethylene-4,5α-dihydro-17α-methyltestosterone		✓	–	–
Stanozolol	17α-Methyl-2'H-5α-androst-2-eno[3,2-c]pyrazol-17β-ol		✓	–	–
Mebolazine (dimethazine, di(methasterone) azine)	3,3-[(1E,2E)-1,2-Hydrazinediylidene]di(2α,17α-dimethyl-5α-androstan-17β-ol)^{?}		✓	–	✓

== 19-Nortestosterone (nandrolone) derivatives ==
=== Non-17α-alkylated ===
Compound	Chemical name	Structure	Marketed	Prohormone-like	Prodrug
Nandrolone (nortestosterone)	19-Nortestosterone		✓	–	–
11β-Methyl-19-nortestosterone (11β-MNT)	11β-Methyl-19-nortestosterone		–	–	–
Dienolone	19-Nor-δ^{9}-testosterone		–	–	–
Dimethandrolone	7α,11β-Dimethyl-19-nortestosterone		–	–	–
Norclostebol	4-Chloro-19-nortestosterone		✓	–	–
Oxabolone	4-Hydroxy-19-nortestosterone		✓	–	–
Trenbolone (trienolone)	19-Nor-δ^{9,11}-testosterone		✓	–	–
Trestolone (MENT)	7α-Methyl-19-nortestosterone		–	–	–
7α-Methyl-19-nor-4-androstenedione (MENT dione, trestione)	7α-Methyl-19-nor-4-androstenedione		–	✓	–
19-Nor-5-androstenediol	19-Nor-5-androstenediol		–	✓	–
19-Nor-5-androstenedione	19-Nor-5-androstenedione		–	✓	–
19-Nordehydroepiandrosterone	19-Nor-5-dehydroepiandrosterone (19-nor-DHEA)		–	✓	–
Bolandiol (nor-4-androstenediol)	19-Nor-4-androstenediol		✓	✓	–
Bolandione (nor-4-androstenedione)	19-Nor-4-androstenedione		–	✓	–
Dienedione (nor-4,9-androstadienedione)	19-Nor-δ^{9}-4-androstenedione		–	✓	–
Methoxydienone (methoxygonadiene)	18-Methyl-19-nor-δ^{2,5(10)}-epiandrosterone 3-methyl ether		–	✓	–
Trendione (nor-4,9,11-androstatrienedione)	19-Nor-δ^{9,11}-4-androstenedione		–	✓	–
Bolmantalate (nandrolone adamantoate)	19-Nortestosterone 17β-adamantoate		✓	–	✓

=== 17α-Alkylated ===
Compound	Chemical name	Structure	Marketed	Prohormone-like	Prodrug
Dimethyltrienolone (7α,17α-dimethyltrenbolone)	7α,17α-Dimethyl-19-nor-δ^{9,11}-testosterone		–	–	–
Dimethyldienolone (7α,17α-dimethyldienolone)	7α,17α-Dimethyl-19-nor-δ^{9}-testosterone		–	–	–
Ethyldienolone	17α-Ethyl-19-nor-δ^{9}-testosterone		–	–	–
Ethylestrenol (ethylnandrol)	17α-Ethyl-3-deketo-19-nortestosterone		✓	–	–
Methyldienolone	17α-Methyl-19-nor-δ^{9}-testosterone		–	–	–
Methylhydroxynandrolone (MOHN, MHN)	4-Hydroxy-17α-methyl-19-nortestosterone		–	–	–
Metribolone (methyltrienolone, R-1881)	17α-Methyl-19-nor-δ^{9,11}-testosterone		–	–	–
Mibolerone	7α,17α-Dimethyl-19-nortestosterone		✓	–	–
Norboletone	17α-Ethyl-18-methyl-19-nortestosterone		–	–	–
Norethandrolone (ethylnandrolone, ethylestrenolone)	17α-Ethyl-19-nortestosterone		✓	–	–
Normethandrone (methylestrenolone, normethisterone)	17α-Methyl-19-nortestosterone		✓	–	–
RU-2309 (18-methymetribolone, 17α-methyl-THG)	17α,18-Dimethyl-19-nor-δ^{9,11}-testosterone		–	–	–
Tetrahydrogestrinone (THG)	17α-Ethyl-18-methyl-19-nor-δ^{9,11}-testosterone		–	–	–
Bolenol (ethylnorandrostenol)	3-Deketo-17α-ethyl-19-nor-5-androstenediol		–	✓	–
Propetandrol	17α-Ethyl-19-nortestosterone 3-propionate		✓	–	✓

=== 17α-alkenyl and -alkynyl ===
Compound	Chemical name	Structure	Marketed	Prohormone-like	Prodrug
Norvinisterone (vinylnortestosterone)	17α-Ethenyl-19-nortestosterone		✓	–	–
Norethisterone (norethindrone)	17α-Ethynyl-19-nortestosterone		✓	–	–
Etynodiol (ethynodiol, 3β-hydroxynorethisterone)	17α-Ethynyl-3-deketo-3β-hydroxy-19-nortestosterone		–	–	–
Gestrinone (ethylnorgestrienone, R-2323)	17α-Ethynyl-18-methyl-19-nor-δ^{9,11}-testosterone		✓	–	–
Levonorgestrel ((−)-norgestrel)	(−)-17α-Ethynyl-18-methyl-19-nortestosterone		✓	–	–
Lynestrenol (3-deketonorethisterone)	17α-Ethynyl-3-deketo-19-nortestosterone		✓	–	–
Norgestrel (18-methylnorethisterone)	17α-Ethynyl-18-methyl-19-nortestosterone		✓	–	–
Norgestrienone (ethynyltrenbolone)	17α-Ethynyl-19-nor-δ^{9,11}-testosterone		✓	–	–
Tibolone (7α-methylnoretynodrel)	7α-Methyl-17α-ethynyl-19-nor-δ^{5(10)}-testosterone		✓	–	–
Quingestanol	4-Hydro-19-nor-δ^{3,5}-testosterone 3-cyclopentyl ether^{?}		–	–	✓
Etynodiol diacetate (ethynodiol diacetate)	17α-Ethynyl-3-deketo-3β-hydroxy-19-nortestosterone 3β,17β-diacetate		✓	–	✓
Norethisterone acetate (norethindrone acetate)	17α-Ethynyl-19-nortestosterone 17β-acetate		✓	–	✓
Norethisterone enanthate (norethindrone enanthate)	17α-Ethynyl-19-nortestosterone 17β-enanthate		✓	–	✓
Quingestanol acetate	4-Hydro-17α-ethynyl-19-nor-δ^{3,5}-testosterone 3-cyclopentyl ether 17β-acetate^{?}		✓	–	✓

The 17α-ethenylated (vinylated) testosterone derivative norvinisterone (vinylnortestosterone) is much more potent as an AAS than the 17α-ethynylated testosterone derivatives and is intermediate in potency between the 17α-ethynylated progestins and conventional AAS, with approximately one-third and one-fifth of the respective androgenic and anabolic activity of nandrolone in animal bioassays.

Vinyltestosterone has been described as a weak AAS, though stronger than its 17α-ethynylated analogue ethisterone.

== See also ==
- List of steroids
- List of designer drugs § Androgens
- List of androgens/anabolic steroids available in the United States

== Notes ==
^{?} = Chemical names that are unverified.
