= List of drugs banned by the World Anti-Doping Agency =

The International Standard for the Prohibited List is the standard published by the World Anti-Doping Agency (WADA) that lists substances prohibited in competitive sport. It is updated at least once per year as required by the World Anti-Doping Code. The adoption of the first World Anti-Doping Code (the Code) occurred at the 2nd World Conference on Doping in Sport in March 2003 in Copenhagen, Denmark. It was there that WADA assumed the responsibility of maintaining, updating, and publishing the List of Prohibited Substances and Methods (the List) in sport. The List is to be updated and published by WADA at least annually. WADA specifies that the List generally includes any substance that meets any two of the following criteria: it enhances sport performance, it represents a health risk to the athlete, it violates the spirit of sport (as defined in the WADA Code).

Substances and techniques that are prohibited by WADA fall into the following categories: S0 non-approved substances; S1 anabolic agents; S2 peptide hormones, growth factors, related substances, and mimetics; S3 beta-2 agonists; S4 hormone and metabolic modulators; S5 diuretics and masking agents; prohibited methods (M1 blood doping, M2 manipulation of samples, M3 gene doping); S6 stimulants; S7 narcotics; S8 cannabinoids; S9 glucocorticoids; P1 beta-blockers.

== Blood doping ==
Blood doping is the injection of red blood cells, related blood products that contain red blood cells, or artificial oxygen containers. This is done by extracting and storing one's own blood prior to an athletic competition, well in advance of the competition so that the body can replenish its natural levels of red blood cells, and subsequently injecting the stored blood immediately before competition. The resulting unnatural level of red blood cells improves oxygen transport and athletic endurance; thus, it is prohibited in most events. It is often used in extreme sports like cycling, snowboarding, and skiing where endurance is highly valued. The most famous example of this type of doping is Lance Armstrong's performance in the Tour de France.

== Banned anabolic agents ==
Banned anabolic agents are, for the purpose of WADA, either anabolic steroids, which activate testosterone and epitestosterone receptors, thereby improving muscle strength and endurance, or "other anabolic agents". Andro, DHEA, stanozolol, testosterone, and nandrolone, or derivates (see below) are banned anabolic steroids. Other banned anabolic agents include clenbuterol, tibolone, zeranol, zilpaterol, and selective androgen receptor modulators. While a few of the banned drugs are endogenous, that is they are normally produced in the human body, most of the banned drug are exogenous drugs chemically produced. These types of drugs were used extensively in Major League Baseball in the 1990s and early 2000s.

=== Exogenous anabolic androgenic steroids ===
This is the complete list of exogenous (non-natural) androgenic agents banned as of January 1, 2012:

- 1-Androstenediol
- 1-Androstenedione
- Bolandiol
- Bolasterone
- Boldenone
- Boldione
- Calusterone
- Clostebol
- Danazol
- Dehydrochlormethyltestosterone
- Desoxymethyltestosterone
- Drostanolone
- Ethylestrenol
- Fluoxymesterone
- Formebolone
- Furazabol
- Gestrinone
- 4-Hydroxytestosterone
- Mestanolone
- Mesterolone
- Metenolone
- Methandienone
- Methandriol
- Methasterone
- Methyldienolone
- Methyl-1-testosterone
- Methylnortestosterone
- Methyltestosterone
- Metribolone
- Mibolerone
- Nandrolone
- 19-Norandrostenedione
- Norboletone
- Norclostebol
- Norethandrolone
- Oxabolone
- Oxandrolone
- Oxymesterone
- Oxymetholone
- Prostanozol
- Quinbolone
- Stanozolol
- Stenbolone
- 1-Testosterone
- Tetrahydrogestrinone
- Trenbolone

Drugs with similar structures and biological activity are also banned because new designer drugs of this sort are always being developed in order to beat the drug tests.

Caffeine, a stimulant known to improve performance, is currently not on the banned list. It was listed until 2004, with a maximum allowed level of 12 micrograms per millilitre urine.

=== Endogenous anabolic androgenic steroids ===
The following substances, ordinarily produced naturally in the body, are prohibited when administered from outside the body.

- Androstenediol
- Androstenedione
- Dihydrotestosterone
- Prasterone (dehydroepiandrosterone DHEA)
- Testosterone

==== Metabolites and isomers ====
Metabolites and isomers of endogenous anabolic androgenic steroids, including:

- 5α-Androstane-3α,17α-diol
- 5α-Androstane-3α,17β-diol
- 5α-Androstane-3β,17α-diol
- 5α-Androstane-3β,17β-diol
- Androst-4-ene-3α,17α-diol
- Androst-4-ene-3α,17β-diol
- Androst-4-ene-3β,17α-diol
- Androst-4-ene-3β,17α-diol
- Androst-5-ene-3α,17α-diol
- Androst-5-ene-3α,17β-diol
- Androst-5-ene-3β,17α-diol
- 4-Androstenediol
- 5-Androstenedione
- Epi-dihydrotestosterone
- Epitestosterone
- 3α-Hydroxy-5α-androstan-17-one
- 3β-Hydroxy-5α-androstan-17-one
- 7α-Hydroxy-DHEA
- 7β-Hydroxy-DHEA
- 7-Keto-DHEA
- 19-Norandrosterone
- 19-Noretiocholanolone

=== Other anabolic agents ===
- Clenbuterol – a beta-agonist; anabolic ability dubious
- Selective androgen receptor modulators (SARMs)
- Tibolone – a synthetic steroid
- Zeranol – a nonsteroidal estrogen
- Zilpaterol – a beta2-agnoist; anabolic ability dubious

== Peptide hormones and related substances ==
Certain peptide hormones increase bulk, strength, and oxygen-carrying red blood cells.

Erythropoiesis-stimulating agents such as erythropoietin (EPO), darbepoetin (dEPO), hypoxia-inducible factor (HIF) stabilizers, methoxy polyethylene glycol-epoetin beta (CERA) and peginesatide (Hematide); growth hormone (hGH), insulin-like growth factors (IGF-1, etc.), fibroblast growth factors (FGFs), hepatocyte growth factors (HGF), mechano growth factors (MGFs), platelet-derived growth factor (PDGF), vascular endothelial growth factor (VEGF), human chorionic gonadotropin (hcG, banned in men only), somatotrophin (growth hormone), insulins and corticotrophins, corticosteroid mimics, and their releasing factor, are banned.

Also banned are any other growth factor affecting muscle, tendon or ligament protein synthesis/degradation, vascularization, energy utilization, regenerative capacity or fiber type switching, and other substances with similar chemical structure and/or biological effects.

== Beta-2 agonists ==
All beta-2 agonists and their D- and L-isomers, are banned. However, formoterol, salbutamol, salmeterol, and terbutaline may be used with a "therapeutic use exemption", only in the inhaled form.

== Hormone and metabolic modulators ==
Hormone levels of a particular hormone, like testosterone, can be changed not only by administering it, but also by altering related hormones. For example, the estrogens estrone and estradiol are biosynthetically produced by the enzyme aromatase, respectively, from androstenedione and testosterone, which are both produced from 17α-hydroxyprogesterone. Thus, when the body senses low levels of estrogen, the precursor compounds 17α-hydroxyprogesterone, androstenedione, and testosterone are up-regulated. Likewise, interfering with a hormone's receptor leads to similar effects.

Because of these natural hormone-hormone interdependent biosynthetic pathways and hormone-receptor interactions, all aromatase inhibitors, including anastrozole, letrozole, aminoglutethimide, exemestane, formestane, and testolactone are banned. Selective estrogen receptor modulators, including raloxifene, tamoxifen and toremifene are banned. Clomiphene, cyclofenil, fulvestrant, and all other anti-estrogenic substances are banned. Myostatin inhibitors are banned. Metabolic modulators including peroxisome proliferator-activated receptor delta (PPARδ) agonists (e.g., GW 1516), PPARδ-AMP-activated protein kinase (AMPK) axis agonists (e.g. AICAR) are also banned. Meldonium was banned on 1 January 2016, which was often used during the Russian doping scandal.

== Diuretics and masking agents ==
Diuretics, which increase the production of urine, and masking agents, chemical compounds which interfere with drug tests, are banned for two reasons. First, by decreasing water retention and thus decreasing an athlete's weight, an important consideration in many speed sports (e.g. track and field, speed skating), they increase the speed of an athlete. Secondly, increased urine production depletes the concentration of both the banned drugs and their metabolites, making their detection more difficult. Masking agents, on the other hand, work by making drug tests ineffective, leading to false-negative results. Desmopressin, plasma expanders (such as glycerol; intravenous administration of albumin, dextran, hydroxyethyl starch and mannitol), probenecid, and other substances with similar biological effects are also banned. Local application of felypressin in dental anesthesia is not prohibited.

=== Diuretics ===
The following diuretics, and chemicals with similar structure or biological activity are banned:

- Acetazolamide
- Amiloride
- Bendroflumethiazide
- Bumetanide
- Canrenone
- Chlorthalidone
- Chlorothiazide
- Etacrynic acid
- Furosemide
- Hydrochlorothiazide
- Indapamide
- Metolazone
- Spironolactone
- Triamterene

== Stimulants ==
Stimulants directly affect the central nervous system, increasing blood flow and heart rate. These drugs primarily help athletes in complex team sports like basketball and association football as well as choreographed sports like figure skating and artistic gymnastics. Stimulants that are banned in competition only include amphetamines, beta-2 agonists, ephedrine, pseudoephedrine, fencamfamine, cocaine, methamphetamines, mesocarb, and other substances with similar chemical structures and biological effects, including the following:

- Adrafinil
- Adrenaline (local use allowed)
- Amfepramone
- Amiphenazole
- Amphetamine
- Amphetaminil
- Armodafinil (active enantiomer of Modafinil)
- Benfluorex
- Benzphetamine
- Benzylpiperazine
- Bromantane (Ladasten)
- Cathine (5 ug/ml urine limit)
- Cathinone
- Clobenzorex
- Cocaine
- Cropropamide
- Crotetamide
- Cyclazodone
- Dimethylamphetamine
- 1,3-Dimethylbutylamine
- Ephedrine
- Etamivan
- Etilamphetamine
- Etilefrine
- Famprofazone
- Fenbutrazate
- Fencamfamin
- Fencamine
- Fenetylline
- Fenfluramine
- Fenproporex
- Furfenorex
- Heptaminol
- Isometheptene
- Levmethamfetamine
- Meclofenoxate
- Mefenorex
- Mephentermine
- Mesocarb
- Methamphetamine (D-)
- 4-Methylamphetamine
- Methylenedioxyamphetamine
- Methylenedioxymethamphetamine
- Methylephedrine
- Methylphenidate
- Modafinil
- Nikethamide
- Norfenefrine
- Norfenfluramine
- Octopamine
- Ortetamine
- Oxilofrine
- Parahydroxyamphetamine
- Pemoline
- Pentetrazol
- Phendimetrazine
- Phenmetrazine
- Phentermine
- 4-Phenylpiracetam (carphedon)
- Prenylamine
- Prolintane
- Propylhexedrine
- Selegiline
- Sibutramine
- Strychnine
- Tuaminoheptane

== Narcotics ==
Narcotic analgesics decrease the painful sensations of serious injuries, potentially allowing athletes to continue training for competition after an injury. While some painkillers are allowed, including codeine, the following are banned in competition only:

- Buprenorphine
- Dextromoramide
- Diamorphine (heroin)
- Fentanyl and its derivatives
- Methadone
- Morphine
- Oxycodone
- Oxymorphone
- Pentazocine
- Pethidine

== Natural and synthetic cannabinoids ==
The following are banned for in-competition use only, with the exception of cannabidiol (CBD) which is not banned for any use. In 2013, the level of THC metabolite allowed was changed from 15 ng/mL to 150 ng/mL so as to only detect in-competition use.

- In cannabis (hashish, marijuana) and cannabis products
- Synthetic cannabinoids that mimic the effects of THC
- Natural and synthetic tetrahydrocannabinols (THCs)

== Glucocorticoids ==
Glucocorticoids are a class of corticosteroids that affect the metabolism of carbohydrates, fat, and proteins, and regulate glycogen and blood pressure levels. They possess pronounced anti-inflammatory activity and cause alteration of connective tissue in response to injuries. The anti-inflammatory and connective tissue effects of glucocorticoids might mask injuries, leading to more serious injuries to athletes. Because of this and metabolic regulation effects, the administration of any glucocorticoid orally, rectally, intravenously, or intramuscularly is prohibited in competition only and requires a therapeutic use exemption. Topical uses of glucocorticoids does not require an exemption.

== Beta blockers ==
Beta blockers are prohibited during competition in a number of sports; out of competition, they are prohibited only in archery and shooting. The prohibited beta blockers include:

- Acebutolol
- Alprenolol
- Atenolol
- Betaxolol
- Bisoprolol
- Bunolol
- Carteolol
- Carvedilol
- Celiprolol
- Esmolol
- Labetalol
- Levobunolol
- Metipranolol
- Metoprolol
- Nadolol
- Oxprenolol
- Pindolol
- Propranolol
- Sotalol
- Timolol

== Therapeutic use exemptions ==
Therapeutic use exemption (TUE) is a term used by WADA and the United States Anti-Doping Agency to denote banned substances that athletes may be "required to take to treat an illness or condition". These exemptions are regulated by the International Standard for Therapeutic Use Exemptions (ISTUE). The detection of such substances in samples is labelled by WADA as an "adverse analytical finding" (AAF), which is distinct from "anti-doping rules violations" (ADRV).

== Methods ==
Prohibited methods include manipulation of blood components (e.g. autologous red blood cell transfer, "blood doping"), manipulation of samples, and gene doping. These are prohibited at all times.

== See also ==
- Doping at the Asian Games
- Doping at the Olympics
