= List of androstanes =

This is a list of androstanes and androstane derivatives.

== Androstanes ==
- Androstanol
  - 3α,5α-Androstanol (5α-androstan-3α-ol) – an endogenous CAR antagonist
  - 3α,5β-Androstanol (5α-androstan-3β-ol) – an endogenous CAR antagonist
  - 5α,17-Androstanol (5α-androstan-17-ol) – an endogenous CAR antagonist
- Androstanone
  - 5α-Androstanone (5α-androstan-3-one)
- Androstanediol
  - 3α-Androstanediol (5α-androstane-3α,17β-diol) – an endogenous androgen, estrogen, and neurosteroid
  - 3β-Androstanediol (5α-androstane-3β,17β-diol) – an endogenous estrogen
- Androstanedione
  - 5α-Androstanedione (5α-androstane-3,17-dione)
  - 5β-Androstanedione (5β-androstane-3,17-dione)
- Androstanolone
  - Dihydrotestosterone (5α-androstan-17β-ol-3-one) – an endogenous androgen
  - 5β-Dihydrotestosterone (5β-androstan-17β-ol-3-one)
  - Androsterone (5α-androstan-3α-ol-17-one) – an endogenous androgen and neurosteroid
  - Epiandrosterone (5α-androstan-3β-ol-17-one) – an endogenous androgen
  - Etiocholanolone (5β-androstan-3α-ol-17-one) – an endogenous neurosteroid
  - Epietiocholanolone (5β-androstan-3β-ol-17-one)

== Androstenes ==
- Androstenol
  - 3α,5α-Androstenol (5α-androst-16-en-3α-ol) – an endogenous pheromone, neurosteroid, and CAR antagonist
  - 3β,5α-Androstenol (5α-androst-16-en-3β-ol) – an endogenous pheromone
- Androstenone
  - 5α-Androstenone (5α-androst-16-en-3-one) – an endogenous pheromone
- Androstenediol
  - Δ^{5}-Androstenediol (Δ^{5}-androsten-3β,17β-diol) – an endogenous androgen, estrogen, and testosterone intermediate
  - Δ^{4}-Androstenediol (Δ^{4}-androsten-3β,17β-diol) – an androgen and testosterone prodrug
  - Δ^{1}-Androstenediol (Δ^{1}-androsten-3β,17β-diol) – an androgen and δ^{1}-testosterone prodrug
- Androstenedione
  - Δ^{4}-Androstenedione (Δ^{4}-androsten-3,17-dione) – an endogenous androgen and testosterone intermediate
  - Δ^{5}-Androstenedione (Δ^{5}-androsten-3,17-dione) – an androgen and testosterone prodrug
  - Δ^{1}-Androstenedione (Δ^{1}-androsten-3,17-dione) – an androgen and δ^{1}-testosterone prodrug
- Androstenetrione
  - δ^{4}-Androstenetrione (δ^{4}-androstene-3,6,17-trione) – an aromatase inhibitor
- Androstenolone
  - Testosterone (δ^{4}-androsten-17β-ol-3-one) – an endogenous androgen
  - δ^{1}-Testosterone (δ^{1}-androsten-17β-ol-3-one) – an androgen
  - Epitestosterone (δ^{4}-androsten-17α-ol-3-one) – an inactive steroid
  - Dehydroepiandrosterone (δ^{5}-androsten-3β-ol-17-one) – an endogenous androgen, neurosteroid, agonist of PPARα, PXR, and CAR, and testosterone intermediate

== Androstadienes ==
- Androstadienol
  - δ^{5}-Androstadienol (δ^{5},16-androstadien-3β-ol) – an endogenous pheromone
  - δ^{4}-Androstadienol (δ^{4},16-androstadien-3β-ol) – a synthetic pherine
- Androstadienone
  - δ^{4}-Androstadienone (δ^{4},16-androstadien-3-one) – an endogenous pheromone

== Anabolic steroids ==
Many synthetic androgens and anabolic steroids are androstane derivatives.

Some progestins, such as ethisterone and dimethisterone, are also androstane derivatives.

== See also ==
- List of androgens/anabolic steroids
