= Androgen prohormone =

Prohormone of an anabolic-androgenic steroid

An androgen prohormone, or proandrogen, is a prohormone (or prodrug) of an anabolic-androgenic steroid (AAS). They can be prohormones of testosterone or of synthetic AAS, for example, nandrolone (19-nortestosterone). Dehydroepiandrosterone (DHEA), DHEA sulfate (DHEA-S), and androstenedione may all be considered proandrogens of testosterone.

In the last two decades, prohormones have also been used by bodybuilders, athletes, and nonmedical users of AAS and other hormones to refer to substances that are expected to convert to active hormones in the body. The intent is to provide the benefits of taking an AAS without the legal risks, and to achieve the hoped-for benefits or advantages without use of AAS themselves. Many of these compounds are legal to manufacture, sell, possess and ingest eliminating the legal problems associated with schedule III AAS. This also enables chemists to further their legal research and get around the law (albeit for a short time). The typical definition of "prohormone" includes a steroidal molecule that has the opposite molecular structure to testosterone on either the 3a/b position or the 17b position. Testosterone has a ketone group on the 3 carbon and a hydroxyl on the 17b carbon. A steroid with modifications away from testosterone in one or both of these areas is commonly referred to as a "prohormone". These enzymatic changes occur with the body's bidirectional enzymes.

On October 22, 2004, President Bush signed into law the Anabolic Steroid Control Act of 2004 (118 Stat. 1661). The bill was written to become effective in 90 days, which was January 20, 2005. This legislation places both AAS and some androgen prohormones on a list of controlled substances (a new type of "regulatory control"). Statutory definition of AAS: "The term 'anabolic steroid' means any drug or hormonal substance, chemically and pharmacologically related to testosterone (other than estrogens, progestins, corticosteroids and dehydroepiandrosterone)". The Act also lists substances called prohormones, qualifying them as AAS, yet these substances were mainly included in the list due to the generalization of the definition of AAS which makes it currently impossible to synthesize any further substances linked with testosterone for the needs of athlete supplementation.

== Prohormones added to the list of schedule III AAS ==
The 108th Congress amended the Controlled Substances Act to include AAS and to add in information about steroids and steroid precursors. This amendment is sometimes called the Anabolic Steroid Control Act of 2004.

The first thing this amendment did was insert a definition of AAS as follows: "The term 'anabolic steroid' means any drug or hormonal substance, chemically and pharmacologically related to testosterone (other than estrogens, progestins, corticosteroids and dehydroepiandrosterone)."

Apart from the definition, the document enumerates the presently known prohormones:

- Androstanediol (3β,17β-dihydroxy-5α-androstane and 3α,17β-dihydroxy-5α-androstane)
- Androstanedione (5α-androstan-3,17-dione)
- 1-Androstenediol (3α,17β-dihydroxy-5α-androst-1-ene)
- 4-Androstenediol (3β,17β-dihydroxy-androst-4-ene)
- 5-Androstenediol (3β,17β-dihydroxy-androst-5-ene)
- 1-Androstenedione (5α-androst-1-en-3,17-dione)
- 4-Androstenedione (androst-4-en-3,17-dione)
- 5-Androstenedione (androst-5-en-3,17-dione)
- Norandrostenediol (19-nor-4-androstenediol or 3β,17β-dihydroxyestr-4-ene)
- 19-Nor-4-androstenediol (3α,17β-dihydroxyestr-4-ene)
- 19-Nor-5-androstenediol (3β,17β-dihydroxyestr-5-ene and 3α,17β-dihydroxyestr-5-ene)
- Norandrostenedione (19-nor-4-androstenedione or estr-4-en-3,17-dione)
- 19-Nor-5-androstenedione (estr-5-en-3,17-dione)
- Any salt, ester, or ether of a drug or substance listed above

Note that this list contains examples and it is not a closed list – any other compound, which affects testosterone, according to the definition is an AAS under U.S. law.

=== "Designer steroids" and adulterated supplements ===
In view of a total ban from 2004, manufacturers cannot launch next AAS, presently they are interested in substances that are related to hormones, but do not affect testosterone. These include derivatives e.g. methoxydienone (methoxygonadiene; Ethyl Methoxy Gona), methasterone (so called Superdrol or S-Drol) and many others, sometimes called "designer steroids". Such compounds although harmful, do not infringe the Anabolic Steroid Control Act because they do not have any impact on the testosterone level. Owing to the same reason, they did not assist in building muscle and are not applicable in supporting – it is typical that the descriptions of these compounds try to manipulate the chemical concepts, but do not even mention the possibility of raising testosterone – because they do not even have such a potential.

After the publicity of the fraud in the media many manufacturers lost the trust, and the U.S. health authorities began to eliminate suspicious products. The research carried out by state laboratories confirmed that "designer steroids" are, in fact, pharmaceuticals like metandienone, stanazolol, methylstenbolone, boldenone, chlorodehydromethyltestosterone, DHT, and oxandrolone, added to supplements in a random manner. Supplements with different names and described ingredients could have the same steroid (e.g., chlorodehydromethylandrostenediol (Halodrol), desoxymethyltestosterone (Madol, Pheraplex), others) and sometimes supplements with similar names could have different ingredients (e.g. Finabolic).

== Regulation in the United States and Europe ==
Following the introduction of the Anabolic Steroid Control Act, labeling products derived from plant extracts with the help of chemical symbols of organic substances found in these plants or creating names for these substances which referred to prohibited AAS became a popular marketing practice employed by American manufacturers. No analogical act targeting athlete supplementation is in force in the European Union; however each country has its own regulations concerning substances with medicinal properties. Due to the above, one can come in contact with the sale of supplements with names identical to or resembling those questioned by the RDA in the United States (S-DROL, HALODROL, etc.). Laboratory controls indicate that products which declare to include prohormones, prohibited in the US, in fact contain "classic" AAS of the previous generation. Many consumers in Europe did not know that it was illegal produce prohormones in the US after the year 2004 and thought that were consuming various versions of the previously acclaimed supplement, while in fact consuming steroids of unknown origin. In situations like ones described above the purchaser of this fake substance knows neither the type nor the dosage of the ingested hormone, and thus cannot plan a safe gastro-protective regime or supplementary treatment. The consumer also cannot gain access to information concerning the possible long-term consequences of treatment with the unspecified hormone. This has led to the popularity of special forums on which consumers could share their experiences with the substances, yet the fake products could have radically different components, despite similar descriptions and names. Supplement manufacturers who have made a name for themselves and want to remain on the market are currently elaborating AAS based on natural substances (usually plant-derived). In Europe these products are called prohormones.

Producers who still want to offer supplements supporting the hormonal balance can still employ the natural compounds. Known in the field of prohormones Patrick Arnold (the one who introduced 1-AD and the first prohormones) is currently working on ursolic acid, on the other hand in Eastern Europe manufacturers launch supplements based on buteins,- natural compounds considered as the strongest aromatase inhibitors.

== List of androgen/AAS prohormones ==
Testosterone derivatives

- 4-Androstenediol
- 4-Androstenedione (androstenedione; A4)
- 4-Dehydroepiandrosterone (4-DHEA)
- 5-Androstenediol (androstenediol; A5)
- 5-Androstenedione
- 11β-Hydroxyandrostenedione
- Adrenosterone (11-ketoandrostenedione, 11-oxoandrostenedione)
- Atamestane (| 1-methylandrosta-δ^{1}-4-androstenedione)
- Boldione (1,4-androstadienedione)
- Dehydroepiandrosterone (DHEA; androstenolone, prasterone; 5-DHEA)
- Dehydroepiandrosterone enanthate (DHEA-E; prasterone enanthate)
- Exemestane (6-methylidene-δ^{1}-4-androstenedione)
- Formestane (4-hydroxy-4-androstenedione)
- Plomestane (10-propargyl-4-androstenedione)

Dihydrotestosterone derivatives

- 1-Androsterone (1-Andro; 1-DHEA)
- 1-Androstenediol
- 1-Androstenedione
- 5α-Androst-2-en-17-one

Nandrolone (19-Nortestosterone) derivatives

- 7α-Methyl-19-nor-4-androstenedione (MENT dione, trestione)
- 19-Nor-5-androstenediol
- 19-Nor-5-androstenedione
- 19-Nor-5-dehydroepiandrosterone (19-nor-DHEA)
- Bolandiol (nor-4-androstenediol)
- Bolandiol dipropionate
- Bolandione (nor-4-androstenedione)
- Dienedione (nor-4,9-androstadienedione)
- Methoxydienone (methoxygonadiene)
- Trendione (nor-4,9,11-androstatrienedione)

17α-Alkylated testosterone derivatives

- Chlorodehydromethylandrostenediol (CDMA)
- Chloromethylandrostenediol (CMA)
- Methandriol (methylandrostenediol)
- Methandriol bisenanthoyl acetate
- Methandriol diacetate
- Methandriol dipropionate
- Methandriol propionate
- Penmesterol (penmestrol; methyltestosterone 3-cyclopentyl enol ether)

17α-Alkylated nandrolone (19-nortestosterone) derivatives

- Bolenol (ethyl-5-norandrostenol)
- Propetandrol (ethylnor-4-androstenol 3β-propionate)
