= Androstenedione (disambiguation) =

Androstenedione may refer to:

- 4-Androstenedione (androst-4-ene-3,17-dione) – an endogenous weak androgen and estrogen and intermediate to/prohormone of testosterone
- 5-Androstenedione (androst-5-ene-3,17-dione) – a prohormone of testosterone and hence an anabolic-androgenic steroid
- 1-Androstenedione (5α-androst-1-ene-3,17-dione) – a prohormone of 1-testosterone (Δ^{1}-DHT) and hence an anabolic-androgenic steroid

== See also ==
- Androstanedione
- Androstenediol
- Dehydroepiandrosterone
- Androstenolone
- Androstanediol
