= Androstenediol (disambiguation) =

Androstenediol may refer to:

- 5-Androstenediol (androst-5-ene-3β,17β-diol) – an endogenous weak androgen and estrogen and intermediate to/prohormone of testosterone
- 4-Androstenediol (androst-4-ene-3β,17β-diol) – a weak androgen and prohormone of testosterone and hence an anabolic-androgenic steroid
- 1-Androstenediol (5α-androst-1-ene-3β,17β-diol) – a prohormone of 1-testosterone (Δ^{1}-DHT) and hence an anabolic-androgenic steroid

== See also ==
- Androstanediol
- Androstenedione
- Dehydroepiandrosterone
- Androstenolone
- Androstanedione
- Androstanolone
