= 19-Norandrostenediol =

19-Norandrostenediol may refer to:

- Bolandiol (19-nor-4-androstenediol)
- 19-Nor-5-androstenediol

== See also ==
- 19-Norandrostenedione
- Androstenediol
- Androstenedione
