= 19-Nor-5-androstenedione =

Synthetic, orally active anabolic steroid

Clinical data
- Other names: Estr-5-ene-3,17-dione; 19-Norandrost-5-ene-3,17-dione
- Routes of administration: Oral

Identifiers
- IUPAC name: (8R,9S,10R,13S,14S)-13-Methyl-1,2,4,7,8,9,10,11,12,14,15,16-dodecahydrocyclopenta[a]phenanthrene-3,17-dione
- CAS Number: 19289-77-1
- PubChem CID: 18633059
- ChemSpider: 18612511
- UNII: 585LQ9KZN8

Chemical and physical data
- Formula: C_{18}H_{24}O_{2}
- Molar mass: 272.388 g·mol^{−1}
- 3D model (JSmol): Interactive image
- SMILES: C[C@]12CC[C@@H]3[C@H]4CCC(=O)CC4=CC[C@H]3[C@@H]1CCC2=O
- InChI: InChI=1S/C18H24O2/c1-18-9-8-14-13-5-3-12(19)10-11(13)2-4-15(14)16(18)6-7-17(18)20/h2,13-16H,3-10H2,1H3/t13-,14+,15+,16-,18-/m0/s1; Key:WELNRNVZXWUOGT-QXUSFIETSA-N

19-Nor-5-androstenedione, also known as estr-5-ene-3,17-dione, is a synthetic, orally active anabolic-androgenic steroid (AAS) and a derivative of 19-nortestosterone (nandrolone) that was never introduced for medical use. It is an androgen prohormone of nandrolone and of other 19-norandrostanes.

19-Nor-5-androstenedione, 19-nor-5-androstenediol, and other 19-norandrostane prohormones were considered to be nutritional supplements and were sold over-the-counter in the United States as a result of the Dietary Supplement Health and Education Act of 1994 (DSHEA). However, they were banned from sports in 1999 by the International Olympic Committee (IOC) and are currently on the World Anti-Doping Agency (WADA) list of prohibited substances. In 2004, they became controlled substances in the U.S. as a result of the Anabolic Steroid Control Act of 2004.

== See also ==
- 5-Androstenedione
- Bolandiol (19-nor-4-androstenediol)
- Bolandione (19-nor-4-androstenedione)
- Bolenol (17α-ethyl-19-nor-5-androstenol)
- Chlorodehydromethylandrostenediol
- Chloromethylandrostenediol
- Methandriol (17α-methyl-5-androstenediol)
