= C20H29ClO2 =

The molecular formula C_{20}H_{29}ClO_{2} (molar mass: 336.896 g/mol) may refer to:

- Chlorodehydromethylandrostenediol
- Methylclostebol
