= 19-Nordehydroepiandrosterone =

Chemical compound

Clinical data
- Other names: 19-Nor-DHEA; 19-Nor-5-dehydroepiandrosterone; 19-Nor-5-DHEA; Estr-5-en-3β-ol-17-one; 19-Norandrost-5-en-3β-ol-17-one; 3β-Hydroxyestr-5-en-17-one
- Routes of administration: By mouth
- Drug class: Androgen; anabolic steroid; progestogen

Identifiers
- IUPAC name: (3S,8R,9S,10R,13S,14S)-3-hydroxy-13-methyl-2,3,4,7,8,9,10,11,12,14,15,16-dodecahydro-1H-cyclopenta[a]phenanthren-17-one
- CAS Number: 17916-75-5
- PubChem CID: 53990402
- ChemSpider: 277545
- UNII: 7FA3BH94UY

Chemical and physical data
- Formula: C_{18}H_{25}O_{2}
- Molar mass: 273.396 g·mol^{−1}
- 3D model (JSmol): Interactive image
- SMILES: C[C@]12CC[C@@H]3[C@H]4CC[C@@H](CC4=CC[C@H]3[C@@H]1CCC2=O)O
- InChI: InChI=1S/C18H26O2/c1-18-9-8-14-13-5-3-12(19)10-11(13)2-4-15(14)16(18)6-7-17(18)20/h2,12-16,19H,3-10H2,1H3/t12-,13-,14+,15+,16-,18-/m0/s1; Key:KELRVUIFMYCLHB-MTLKIPAASA-N

19-Nordehydroepiandrosterone (19-nor-DHEA), or 19-nor-5-dehydroepiandrosterone (19-nor-5-DHEA), is an estrane (19-norandrostane) steroid which was never marketed. It is the combined derivative of the androgen/anabolic steroid nandrolone (19-nortestosterone) and the androgen prohormone dehydroepiandrosterone (DHEA, or more specifically 5-DHEA). Related compounds include 19-nor-5-androstenediol, bolandiol (19-nor-4-androstenediol), and bolandione (nor-4-androstenedione), which are all known orally active prohormones of nandrolone. 19-Nor-DHEA may occur as a metabolite of bolandione and related steroids.

== Synthesis ==
The chemical synthesis of 19-Nordehydroepiandrosterone was reported.

The enone group in Bolandione (1) is protected with isopropenyl acetate to give the corresponding enol acetate (3-Hydroxy-17-oxoestra-3,5-dien-3-yl acetate) PC11278466 (2). Ketalization of the remaining carbonyl with ethyleneglycol in the presence of triethyl orthoformate gives (3). Reduction of the enol ether by treatment with sodium borohydride occurred to give PC118447212 (4). Hydrolytic removal of the cyclic ketal in weak acid completed the synthesis of 19-Nor-DHEA (5).

== See also ==
- List of androgens/anabolic steroids
