= 19-Norandrostenedione =

19-Norandrostenedione may refer to:

- Bolandione (19-nor-4-androstenedione)
- 19-Nor-5-androstenedione

== See also ==
- 19-Norandrostenediol (disambiguation)
- Androstenedione
- Androstenediol
