= 4-OHT =

4-OHT may refer to:

- Afimoxifene, an estrogen receptor drug
- 4-Hydroxytestosterone, a steroid derived from testosterone
