= Testosterone 17b-dehydrogenase (NADP+) =

Class of enzymes

Testosterone 17beta-dehydrogenase (NADP^{+})

Identifiers
- EC no.: 1.1.1.64
- CAS no.: 9028-63-1

Databases
- IntEnz: IntEnz view
- BRENDA: BRENDA entry
- ExPASy: NiceZyme view
- KEGG: KEGG entry
- MetaCyc: metabolic pathway
- PRIAM: profile
- PDB structures: RCSB PDB PDBe PDBsum
Search
- PMC: articles
- PubMed: articles
- NCBI: proteins

Testosterone 17beta-dehydrogenase (NADP^{+}) (EC 1.1.1.64, 17-ketoreductase, NADP-dependent testosterone-17beta-oxidoreductase, testosterone 17beta-dehydrogenase (NADP)) is an enzyme with systematic name 17beta-hydroxysteroid:NADP^{+} 17-oxidoreductase. This enzyme catalyses the chemical reaction

Testosterone
+ NADP^{+}
H^{+}
H^{+}
Androstenedione
+ NADPH

It also oxidizes 3-hydroxyhexobarbital to 3-oxohexobarbital.
