= Chloromethylandrostenediol =

Chemical compound

Clinical data
- Other names: CMA; Promagnon; Promagnon-25; 4-Chloro-17α-methyl-androst-4-ene-3β,17β-diol
- Routes of administration: Oral

Identifiers
- IUPAC name: (8R,9S,10R,13S,14S,17S)-4-Chloro-10,13,17-trimethyl-1,2,3,6,7,8,9,11,12,14,15,16-dodecahydrocyclopenta[a]phenanthrene-3,17-diol
- CAS Number: 35937-40-7
- PubChem CID: 101548739
- ChemSpider: 57620486
- UNII: 5USQ3RL499

Chemical and physical data
- Formula: C_{20}H_{31}ClO_{2}
- Molar mass: 338.92 g·mol^{−1}
- 3D model (JSmol): Interactive image
- SMILES: C[C@]12CCC(C(=C1CC[C@@H]3[C@@H]2CC[C@]4([C@H]3CC[C@]4(C)O)C)Cl)O
- InChI: InChI=1S/C20H31ClO2/c1-18-9-8-16(22)17(21)15(18)5-4-12-13(18)6-10-19(2)14(12)7-11-20(19,3)23/h12-14,16,22-23H,4-11H2,1-3H3/t12-,13+,14+,16?,18-,19+,20+/m1/s1; Key:FWWFNYYTZPIJFZ-KYPBWNNHSA-N

Chloromethylandrostenediol (CMA), also known as 4-chloro-17α-methyl-androst-4-ene-3β,17β-diol, is a synthetic, orally active anabolic-androgenic steroid (AAS) and a 17α-alkylated derivative of 4-androstenediol that was never marketed. It was first encountered in 2005 when it was introduced as a "dietary supplement" and putative prohormone under the name Promagnon by an online vendor called Peak Performance Laboratories. CMA was voluntarily discontinued by Gaspari Nutrition in late 2006, likely fearing government sanctions if it continued to sell the product.

Although CMA was sold as a "prohormone" or "prosteroid" of chloromethyltestosterone (CMT; also known more commonly as methylclostebol), it is likely that the conversion is far from complete and that much of the activity of the drug may be attributable to its unchanged form. Due to the presence of a chloro group at the C4 position, CMA cannot be aromatized, and for this reason, poses no risk of estrogenic side effects like gynecomastia at any dosage. It is not extensively metabolized by 5α-reductase and exhibits relatively greater anabolic than androgenic activity, but is still capable of producing androgenic side effects like oily skin, acne, and increased growth of facial and body hair, as well as virilization in women. As with other 17α-alkylated AAS, CMA may pose a risk of hepatotoxicity.

CMA is closely related to chlorodehydromethylandrostenediol (CDMA; Halodrol-50) which was developed by industry veteran Bruce Kneller, and was also briefly sold on the Internet in 2005 and 2006, though by a different company (Giant Sports). Both drugs were derived from chlorodehydromethyltestosterone (CDMT; brand name Oral Turinabol), a popular AAS that was introduced in the 1960s.

== See also ==
- 1-Androstenediol
- Bolenol
- Methandriol
- Methylclostebol
