= Dehydroepiandrosterone (disambiguation) =

Dehydroepiandrosterone (DHEA) may refer to:

- 5-Dehydroepiandrosterone (5-DHEA; androstenolone, prasterone)
- 4-Dehydroepiandrosterone (4-DHEA)
- 1-Dehydroepiandrosterone (1-DHEA)

== See also ==
- Androstenediol
- Androstenedione
- Androstenolone
