= C20H32O =

The molecular formula C_{20}H_{32}O (molar mass: 288.46 g/mol, exact mass: 288.2453 u) may refer to:

- Bolenol, also known as ethylnorandrostenol
- Desoxymethyltestosterone
- Ethylestrenol, an anabolic steroid
