= Enestebol =

Chemical compound

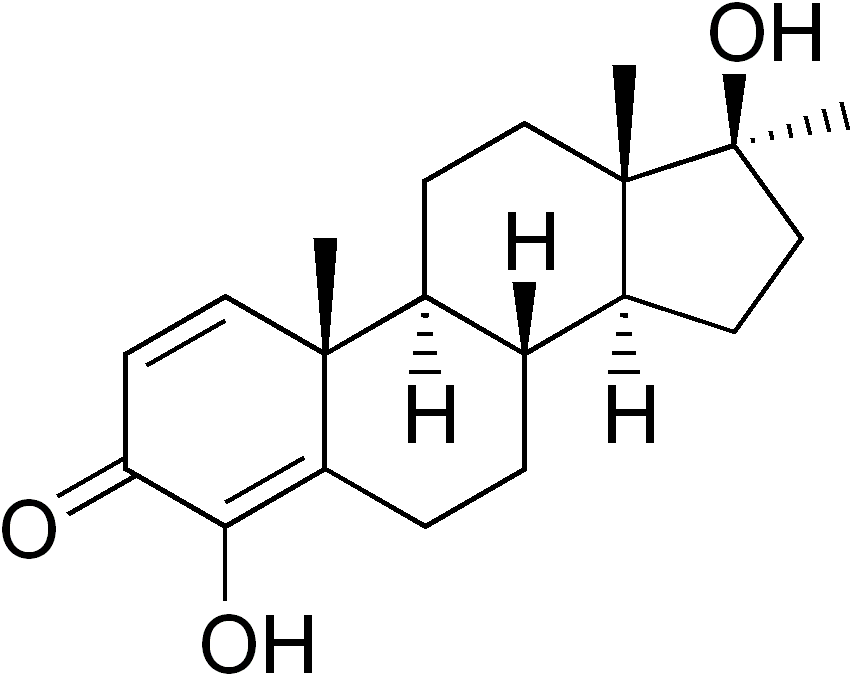

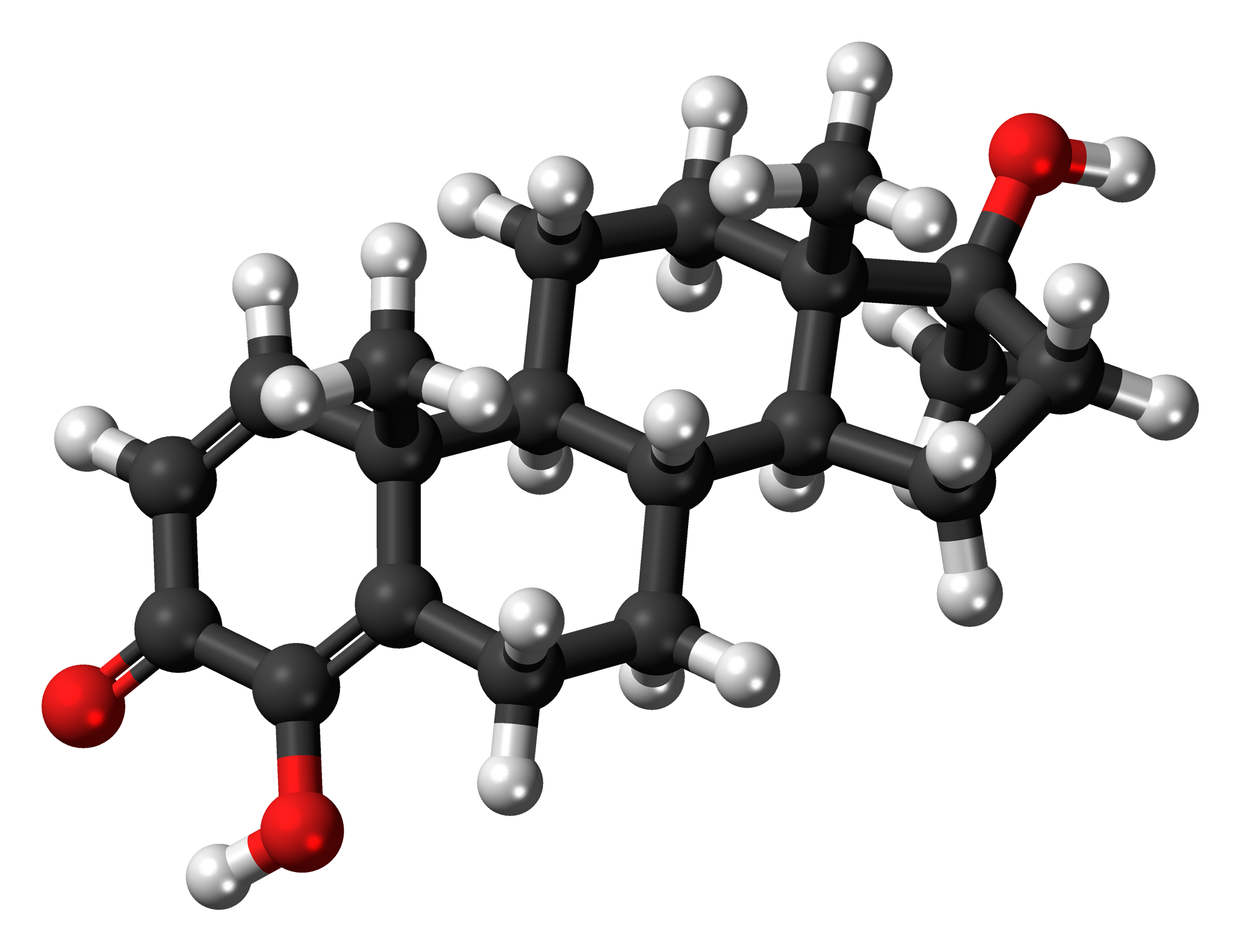

Clinical data
- Other names: 4,17β-Dihydroxy-17α-methylandrosta-1,4-dien-3-one
- Routes of administration: By mouth
- Drug class: Androgen; Anabolic steroid

Identifiers
- IUPAC name: (8R,9S,10R,13S,14S)-4,17-dihydroxy-10,13,17-trimethyl-7,8,9,11,12,14,15,16-octahydro-6H-cyclopenta[a]phenanthren-3-one
- CAS Number: 2320-86-7
- PubChem CID: 208919
- ChemSpider: 16736606
- UNII: LNS3MVH7NV
- ChEMBL: ChEMBL2104239
- CompTox Dashboard (EPA): DTXSID40945880

Chemical and physical data
- Formula: C_{20}H_{28}O_{3}
- Molar mass: 316.441 g·mol^{−1}
- 3D model (JSmol): Interactive image
- SMILES: C[C@]12CC[C@H]3[C@H]([C@@H]1CCC2(C)O)CCC4=C(C(=O)C=C[C@]34C)O
- InChI: InChI=1S/C20H28O3/c1-18-9-8-16(21)17(22)15(18)5-4-12-13(18)6-10-19(2)14(12)7-11-20(19,3)23/h8-9,12-14,22-23H,4-7,10-11H2,1-3H3/t12-,13+,14+,18-,19+,20+/m1/s1; Key:XMPHGFYWQPUCAG-XMUHMHRVSA-N

Enestebol (INN), also known as 4-hydroxy-17α-methyl-δ^{1}-testosterone, as well as 4,17β-dihydroxy-17α-methylandrosta-1,4-dien-3-one, is a synthetic and orally active anabolic–androgenic steroid (AAS) and a 17α-alkylated derivative of testosterone which was never marketed. It is closely related to oxymesterone (4-hydroxy-17α-methyltestosterone), as well as to chlorodehydromethyltestosterone (4-chloro-17α-methyl-δ^{1}-testosterone), methylclostebol (4-chloro-17α-methyltestosterone), and metandienone (17α-methyl-δ^{1}-testosterone).
