= Trendione =

Chemical compound

Clinical data
- Other names: RU-2065; Trenavar; Triendione; Estra-4,9,11-triene-3,17-dione
- Drug class: Androgen; Anabolic steroid; Progestogen

Identifiers
- IUPAC name: (8S,13S,14S)-13-Methyl-1,2,6,7,8,14,15,16-octahydrocyclopenta[a]phenanthrene-3,17-dione
- CAS Number: 4642-95-9
- PubChem CID: 160762
- ChemSpider: 141254
- UNII: 7M9J4CV848
- CompTox Dashboard (EPA): DTXSID80873491

Chemical and physical data
- Formula: C_{18}H_{20}O_{2}
- Molar mass: 268.356 g·mol^{−1}
- 3D model (JSmol): Interactive image
- SMILES: C[C@]12C=CC3=C4CCC(=O)C=C4CC[C@H]3[C@@H]1CCC2=O
- InChI: InChI=1S/C18H20O2/c1-18-9-8-14-13-5-3-12(19)10-11(13)2-4-15(14)16(18)6-7-17(18)20/h8-10,15-16H,2-7H2,1H3/t15-,16+,18+/m1/s1; Key:KBSXJBBFQODDTQ-RYRKJORJSA-N

Trendione (developmental code name RU-2065; nickname Trenavar), also known as estra-4,9,11-triene-3,17-dione, is an androgen prohormone as well as metabolite of the anabolic steroid trenbolone. Trendione is to trenbolone as androstenedione is to testosterone. The compound is inactive itself, showing more than 100-fold lower affinity for the androgen and progesterone receptors than trenbolone. It is a designer steroid and has been sold on the internet as a "nutritional supplement". Trendione is listed in the United States Designer Anabolic Steroid Control Act of 2014.

== See also ==
- List of androgens/anabolic steroids
