= Ketosteroid monooxygenase =

Class of enzymes

Identifiers
- EC no.: 1.14.13.54
- CAS no.: 9044-53-5

Databases
- BRENDA: enzyme data
- ExPASy: NiceZyme view
- KEGG: enzyme entry
- MetaCyc: metabolic pathway
- Rhea: reactions
- PDB structures: RCSB PDB PDBe PDBsum
Search
- PMC: articles
- PubMed: articles
- NCBI: proteins

Ketosteroid monooxygenase (EC 1.14.13.54, steroid-ketone monooxygenase, progesterone, NADPH2:oxygen oxidoreductase (20-hydroxylating, ester-producing), 17alpha-hydroxyprogesterone, NADPH_{2}:oxygen oxidoreductase (20-hydroxylating, side-chain cleaving), androstenedione, NADPH_{2}:oxygen oxidoreductase (17-hydroxylating, lactonizing)) is an enzyme with systematic name ketosteroid, NADPH:oxygen oxidoreductase (20-hydroxylating, ester-producing/20-hydroxylating, side-chain cleaving/17-hydroxylating, lactonizing). This enzyme catalyses the following chemical reaction

ketosteroid + NADPH + H^{+} + O_{2} $\rightleftharpoons$ steroid ester/lactone + NADP^{+} + H_{2}O (general reaction)
(1) progesterone + NADPH + H^{+} + O_{2} $\rightleftharpoons$ testosterone acetate + NADP^{+} + H_{2}O
(2) androstenedione + NADPH + H^{+} + O_{2} $\rightleftharpoons$ testololactone + NADP^{+} + H_{2}O
(3) 17alpha-hydroxyprogesterone + NADPH + H^{+} + O_{2} $\rightleftharpoons$ androstenedione + acetate + NADP^{+} + H_{2}O

Ketosteroid monooxygenase is a single FAD-containing enzyme that catalyses three types of monooxygenase reaction.
