= 4-Hydroxytestosterone =

Chemical compound

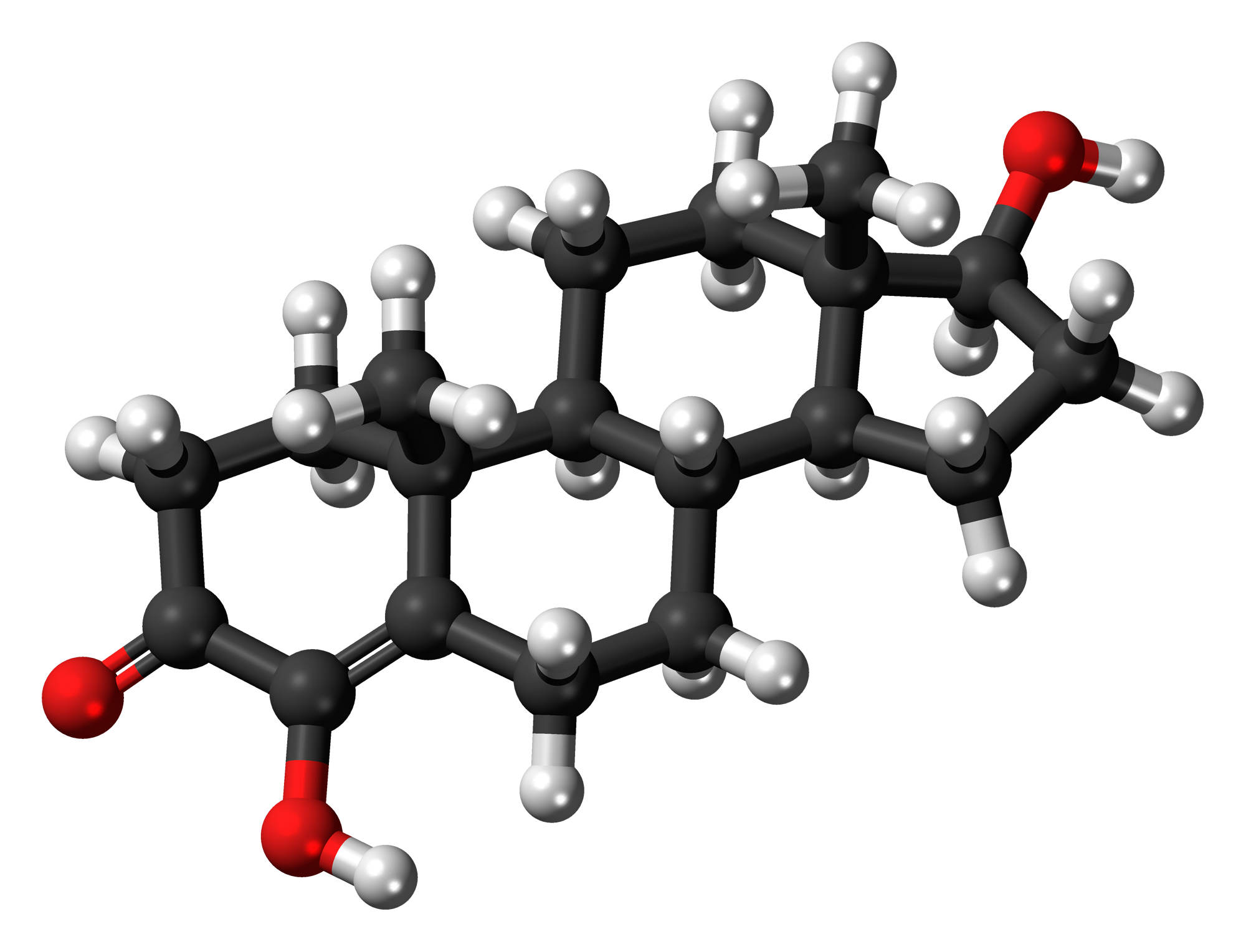

Clinical data
- Other names: 4,17β-Dihydroxyandrost-4-en-3-one; Androst-4-ene-4,17β-diol-3-one; Desmethylenestebol

Identifiers
- IUPAC name: 4,17-Dihydroxy-10,13-dimethyl-1,2,6,7,8,9,10,11,12,13,14,15,16,17-tetradecahydro-cyclopenta[a]phenanthren-3-one
- CAS Number: 2141-17-5
- PubChem CID: 160615
- DrugBank: DB01485
- ChemSpider: 141138
- UNII: 912GOZ167T
- CompTox Dashboard (EPA): DTXSID80902477

Chemical and physical data
- Formula: C_{19}H_{28}O_{3}
- Molar mass: 304.430 g·mol^{−1}
- 3D model (JSmol): Interactive image
- SMILES: O=C4C(\O)=C2/[C@]([C@H]1CC[C@@]3([C@@H](O)CC[C@H]3[C@@H]1CC2)C)(C)CC4
- InChI: InChI=1S/C19H28O3/c1-18-10-8-15(20)17(22)14(18)4-3-11-12-5-6-16(21)19(12,2)9-7-13(11)18/h11-13,16,21-22H,3-10H2,1-2H3/t11-,12-,13-,16-,18+,19-/m0/s1; Key:BQOIJSIMMIDHMO-FBPKJDBXSA-N

4-Hydroxytestosterone (4-OHT), also known as 4,17β-dihydroxyandrost-4-en-3-one, is a synthetic anabolic-androgenic steroid (AAS) and a derivative of testosterone that was never marketed. It was first patented by G.D. Searle & Company in 1955 and is testosterone with a hydroxy group at the four position. 4-OHT has moderate anabolic, mild androgenic, and anti-aromatase properties and is similar to the steroid clostebol (4-chlorotestosterone).

== See also ==
- 4-Androstene-3,6,17-trione
- Androstenedione
- Enestebol
- Formestane
- 11β-Hydroxytestosterone
