= Methylclostebol =

Chemical compound

Clinical data
- Other names: Chloromethyltestosterone; CMT; 4-Chloro-17α-methyltestosterone; 4-Chloro-17α-methylandrost-4-en-17β-ol-3-one
- Routes of administration: Oral

Legal status
- Legal status: US: Schedule III

Identifiers
- IUPAC name: (8R,9S,10R,13S,14S,17S)-4-Chloro-17-hydroxy-10,13,17-trimethyl-2,6,7,8,9,11,12,14,15,16-decahydro-1H-cyclopenta[a]phenanthren-3-one
- CAS Number: 5785-58-0
- PubChem CID: 227107
- ChemSpider: 197559
- UNII: 0956Z23Q9N
- ChEBI: CHEBI:79860
- CompTox Dashboard (EPA): DTXSID201017250

Chemical and physical data
- Formula: C_{20}H_{29}ClO_{2}
- Molar mass: 336.90 g·mol^{−1}
- 3D model (JSmol): Interactive image
- SMILES: C[C@]12CCC(=O)C(=C1CC[C@@H]3[C@@H]2CC[C@]4([C@H]3CC[C@]4(C)O)C)Cl
- InChI: InChI=1S/C20H29ClO2/c1-18-9-8-16(22)17(21)15(18)5-4-12-13(18)6-10-19(2)14(12)7-11-20(19,3)23/h12-14,23H,4-11H2,1-3H3/t12-,13+,14+,18-,19+,20+/m1/s1; Key:SOMOGWLYTLQJGT-XMUHMHRVSA-N

Methylclostebol, also known as 4-chloro-17α-methyltestosterone or as 4-chloro-17α-methylandrost-4-en-17β-ol-3-one, is a synthetic, orally active anabolic-androgenic steroid (AAS) and designer steroid that has been sold on the Internet as a "dietary supplement", but it has never been studied for medical use. It is the 17α-alkylated variant of clostebol (4-chlorotestosterone).

Rahnema, Crosnoe, and Kim (2015) reported that German athletes used methylclostebol as a performance enhancing drug in the 1960s and 1970s, but this has not been substantiated. The compound is listed as a banned anabolic agent by the World Anti-Doping Agency.

== See also ==
- Chlorodehydromethylandrostenediol
- Chlorodehydromethyltestosterone
- Chloromethylandrostenediol
- Oxymesterone
