= Dehydroandrosterone =

Chemical compound

Names
- IUPAC name 3α-Hydroxyandrost-5-en-17-one
- Systematic IUPAC name (3aS,3bR,7R,9aR,9bS,11aS)-7-Hydroxy-9a,11a-dimethyl-2,3,3a,3b,4,6,7,8,9,9a,9b,10,11,11a-tetradecahydro-1H-cyclopenta[a]phenanthren-1-one
- Other names DHA; 5-Dehydroandrosterone; 5-DHA; Androst-5-en-3α-ol-17-one; Isoandrostenolone

Identifiers
CAS Number	2283-82-1
3D model (JSmol)	Interactive image
ChemSpider	118560
PubChem CID	134506
UNII	W9LD7Y7MBC
CompTox Dashboard (EPA)	DTXSID20177384
- InChI: InChI=1S/C19H28O2/c1-18-9-7-13(20)11-12(18)3-4-14-15-5-6-17(21)19(15,2)10-8-16(14)18/h3,13-16,20H,4-11H2,1-2H3/t13-,14+,15+,16+,18+,19+/m1/s1 Key: FMGSKLZLMKYGDP-HKQXQEGQSA-N
- SMILES: C[C@]12CC[C@H]3[C@H]([C@@H]1CCC2=O)CC=C4[C@@]3(CC[C@H](C4)O)C

Properties
Chemical formula	C_{19}H_{28}O_{2}
Molar mass	288.431 g·mol^{−1}
- Except where otherwise noted, data are given for materials in their standard state (at 25 °C [77 °F], 100 kPa). Infobox references

Dehydroandrosterone (DHA), or 5-dehydroandrosterone (5-DHA), also known as isoandrostenolone, as well as androst-5-en-3α-ol-17-one, is an endogenous androgen steroid hormone. It is the 3α-epimer of dehydroepiandrosterone (DHEA; androst-5-en-3β-ol-17-one) and the 5(6)-dehydrogenated and non-5α-reduced analogue of androsterone (5α-androstan-3α-ol-17-one). DHA is produced in and secreted from the adrenal glands, along with other weak androgens like DHEA, androstenediol, and androstenedione.

== See also ==
- 3α-Androstanediol
- Epiandrosterone
