= Androstenolone =

Androstenolone may refer to:

- Testosterone (androst-4-en-17β-ol-3-one), an endogenous androgen/anabolic steroid and an intermediate in the biosynthesis of estradiol
- Epitestosterone (androst-4-en-17α-ol-3-one), an inactive endogenous steroid
- Dehydroepiandrosterone (DHEA, 5-DHEA) (androst-4-en-3β-ol-17-one), an endogenous weak androgen, an estrogen, a neurosteroid, and an intermediate in the biosynthesis of testosterone
- 1-Testosterone (androst-1-en-17β-ol-3-one), a synthetic androgen/anabolic steroid
- 4-Dehydroepiandrosterone (4-DHEA) (androst-4-en-3β-ol-17-one), an androgen prohormone
- 1-Androsterone (1-DHEA) (5α-androst-1-en-3β-ol-17-one), a synthetic androgen prohormone

== See also ==
- Androstanolone
- Androstenediol
- Androstanedione
- Androstanediol
- Androstenedione
