= Chlorodehydromethylandrostenediol =

Chemical compound

Clinical data
- Other names: CDMA; Halodrol; Halodrol-50
- Routes of administration: Oral

Identifiers
- IUPAC name: (3S,8R,9S,10R,13S,14S,17S)-4-Chloro-10,13,17-trimethyl-3,6,7,8,9,11,12,14,15,16-decahydrocyclopenta[a]phenanthrene-3,17-diol
- CAS Number: 1338221-84-3
- PubChem CID: 29976098
- ChemSpider: 29976098
- UNII: K6PH0FVE0K

Chemical and physical data
- Formula: C_{20}H_{29}ClO_{2}
- Molar mass: 336.90 g·mol^{−1}
- 3D model (JSmol): Interactive image
- SMILES: C[C@]12CC[C@H]3[C@H]([C@@H]1CC[C@]2(C)O)CCC4=C([C@H](C=C[C@]34C)O)Cl
- InChI: InChI=1S/C20H29ClO2/c1-18-9-8-16(22)17(21)15(18)5-4-12-13(18)6-10-19(2)14(12)7-11-20(19,3)23/h8-9,12-14,16,22-23H,4-7,10-11H2,1-3H3/t12-,13+,14+,16+,18-,19+,20+/m1/s1; Key:ZHWBNJVZZYSUJZ-HADYEQCDSA-N

Chlorodehydromethylandrostenediol (CDMA), also known as 4-chloro-17α-methylandrost-1,4-diene-3β,17β-diol, is a synthetic, orally active anabolic-androgenic steroid (AAS) and a 17α-alkylated derivative of 4-androstenediol that was never marketed. It was first encountered in 2005 when it was introduced as a "dietary supplement" and putative prohormone under the name Halodrol-50 by industry veteran Bruce Kneller, during his stint working with the dietary supplement company Gaspari Nutrition. The drug was the subject of a scathing and highly critical article by The Washington Post in November 2006. CDMA was voluntarily discontinued by Gaspari Nutrition in mid-2006, likely fearing government sanctions if it continued to sell the product. During the brief period of time that CDMA was sold online, it was an extremely well-selling product; its total sales are estimated to have been greater than twenty five million dollars, and by some estimates, CDMA may have been the best-selling hormonal product ever sold "over-the-counter" (i.e., without a prescription) in the United States.CDMA continued to be sold online until the 2014 prohormone ban as generic versions known as clones.

Although CDMA was sold as a "prohormone" or "prosteroid" of chlorodehydromethyltestosterone (CDMT), it is likely that the conversion is far from complete and that much of the activity of the drug may be attributable to its unchanged form. Due to the presence of a chloro group at the C4 position, CDMA cannot be aromatized, and for this reason, poses no risk of estrogenic side effects like gynecomastia at any dosage. It is not extensively metabolized by 5α-reductase and exhibits relatively greater anabolic than androgenic activity, but is still capable of producing androgenic side effects like oily skin, acne, and increased growth of facial and body hair, as well as virilization in women. As with other 17α-alkylated AAS, CDMA poses a risk of hepatotoxicity.

CDMA is closely related to chloromethylandrostenediol (CMA; Promagnon), which was also developed by industry veteran Bruce Kneller and was also briefly sold on the Internet in 2005 and 2006, though by a different company (Peak Performance Laboratories). Both compounds were derived from CDMT (brand name Oral Turinabol), a popular AAS that was introduced in the 1960s.

== See also ==
- 1-Androstenediol
- Bolenol
- Clostebol
- Methandriol
