= Propetandrol =

Chemical compound

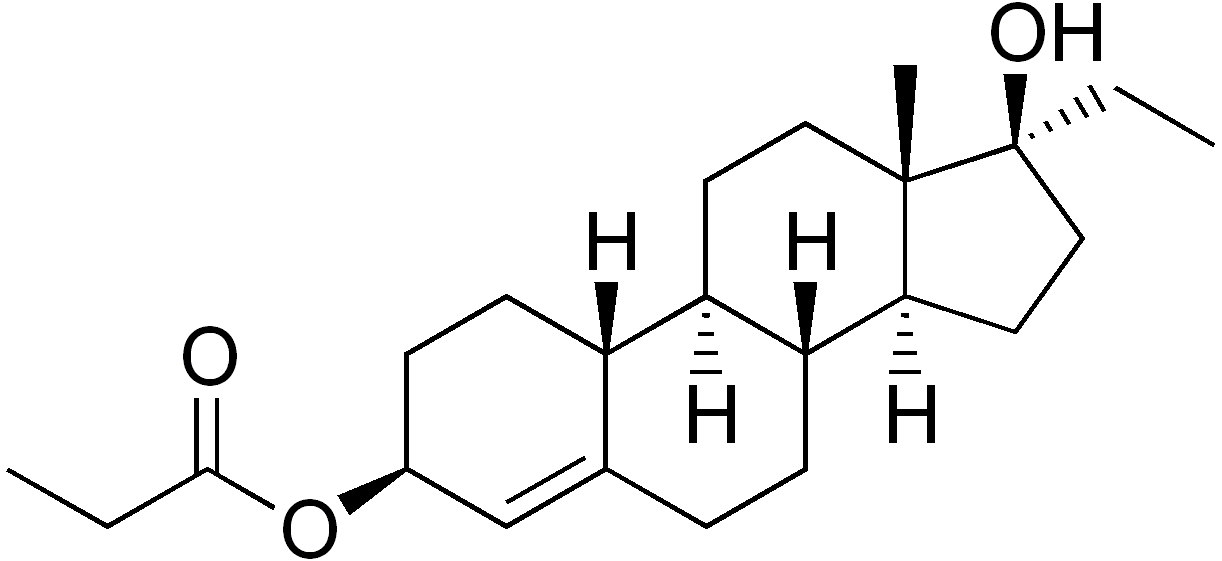

Clinical data
- Trade names: Solevar
- Other names: Propethandrol; SC-7294; 3β-(Propionyloxy)-17α-ethylestr-4-en-17β-ol; 17α-Ethylestr-4-en-3β,17β-diol 3β-propionate; 17α-Ethyl-19-nortestosterone 3β-propionate; 19-Nor-17α-pregn-4-ene-3β,17β-diol 3β-propionate; Norethandrolone 3β-propionate
- Routes of administration: By mouth
- Drug class: Androgen; Anabolic steroid; Androgen ester; Progestogen

Identifiers
- IUPAC name: [(3S,8R,9S,10R,13S,14S,17S)-17-ethyl-17-hydroxy-13-methyl-2,3,6,7,8,9,10,11,12,14,15,16-dodecahydro-1H-cyclopenta[a]phenanthren-3-yl]propanoate
- CAS Number: 3638-82-2
- PubChem CID: 20055548
- ChemSpider: 16737110
- UNII: K0H1J6311W
- ChEMBL: ChEMBL2105236
- CompTox Dashboard (EPA): DTXSID40189909

Chemical and physical data
- Formula: C_{23}H_{36}O_{3}
- Molar mass: 360.538 g·mol^{−1}
- 3D model (JSmol): Interactive image
- SMILES: CCC(=O)O[C@H]1CC[C@@H]2[C@H]3CC[C@]4([C@H]([C@@H]3CCC2=C1)CC[C@]4(CC)O)C
- InChI: InChI=1S/C23H36O3/c1-4-21(24)26-16-7-9-17-15(14-16)6-8-19-18(17)10-12-22(3)20(19)11-13-23(22,25)5-2/h14,16-20,25H,4-13H2,1-3H3/t16-,17-,18+,19+,20-,22-,23-/m0/s1; Key:ODOMHABFTBNARE-JSDYAUHVSA-N

Propetandrol (INN) (brand name Solevar; former developmental code name SC-7294), or propethandrol, also known as 17α-ethyl-19-nortestosterone 3β-propionate or 17α-ethyl-19-nor-4-androstenediol 3β-propionate, as well as 17α-ethylestr-4-en-3β,17β-diol 3β-propionate, is a synthetic and orally active anabolic–androgenic steroid (AAS) and progestogen and a 17α-alkylated derivative of 19-nortestosterone. It is an androgen ester – specifically, the 3β-propionate ester of norethandrolone (17α-ethyl-19-nortestosterone).

== See also ==
- Bolandiol
- Bolenol
- Methandriol
- Penmesterol
