= 1-Dehydroepiandrosterone =

Chemical compound

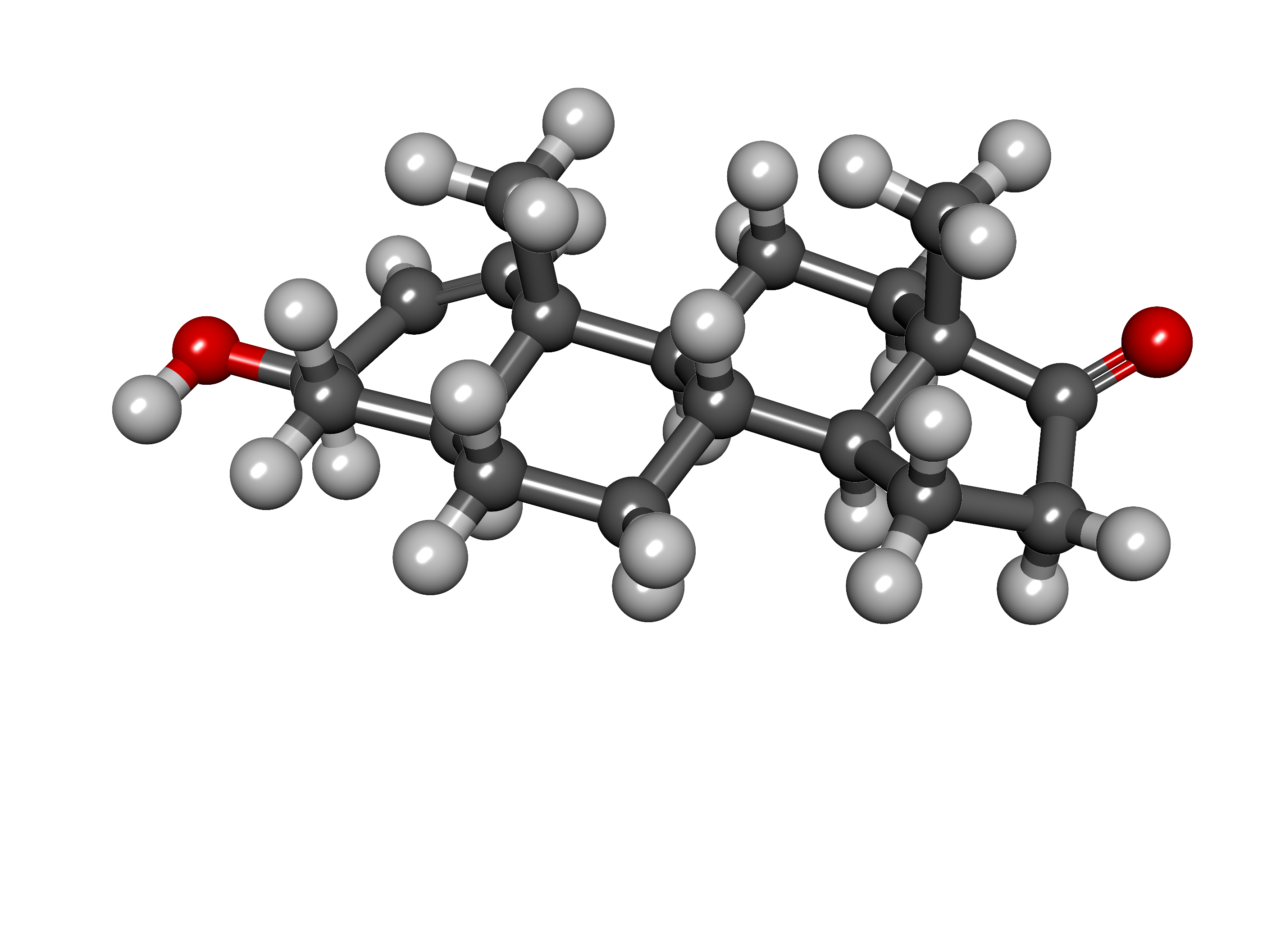

Clinical data
- Other names: 1-Andro; 1-DHEA; 1-Androsterone; δ^{1}-Epiandrosterone; 1-Prasterone; 5α-Androst-1-en-3β-ol-17-one
- Routes of administration: Oral

Identifiers
- IUPAC name: (3R,5S,8R,9S,10R,13S,14S)-3-Hydroxy-10,13-dimethyl-3,4,5,6,7,8,9,11,12,14,15,16-dodecahydrocyclopenta[a]phenanthren-17-one
- CAS Number: 23633-63-8
- PubChem CID: 67430008
- ChemSpider: 48063738
- UNII: U5M72D8OWZ
- CompTox Dashboard (EPA): DTXSID20737265

Chemical and physical data
- Formula: C_{19}H_{28}O_{2}
- Molar mass: 288.431 g·mol^{−1}
- 3D model (JSmol): Interactive image
- SMILES: C[C@]12CC[C@H]3[C@H]([C@@H]1CCC2=O)CC[C@@H]4[C@@]3(C=C[C@@H](C4)O)C
- InChI: InChI=1S/C19H28O2/c1-18-9-7-13(20)11-12(18)3-4-14-15-5-6-17(21)19(15,2)10-8-16(14)18/h7,9,12-16,20H,3-6,8,10-11H2,1-2H3/t12-,13-,14-,15-,16-,18-,19-/m0/s1; Key:DYMROBVXGSLPAY-LUJOEAJASA-N

1-Dehydroepiandrosterone (also known as 1-Andro, 1-DHEA, 1-androsterone or 5α-androst-1-en-3β-ol-17-one) is a synthetic, orally active anabolic-androgenic steroid (AAS). It is an androgen prohormone of 1-testosterone (dihydroboldenone), 1-androstenedione, and other 1-dehydrogenated androstanes. The drug has been sold on the Internet as a designer steroid and "dietary supplement". It is a positional isomer of dehydroepiandrosterone (DHEA; 5-dehydroepiandrosterone).

== See also ==
- 4-Dehydroepiandrosterone
- Androsterone
- Epiandrosterone
