= Norsteroid =

Class of steroids

Norsteroids (nor-, L. norma, from "normal" in chemistry, indicating carbon removal) are a structural class of steroids that have had an atom or atoms (typically carbon) removed, biosynthetically or synthetically, from positions of branching off of rings or side chains (e.g., removal of methyl groups), or from within rings of the steroid ring system. Norsteroids are systematically classified into four categories, A-, B-, C-, and D-norsteroids depending on ring if modified. Natural sources of norsteroids include but are not limited to sponges, corals, terrestrial plants, fungi, and bacteria. For instance, 19-norsteroids (e.g., 19-norprogesterone) constitute an important class of natural and synthetic steroids derived by removal of the methyl group of the natural product progesterone; the equivalent change between testosterone and 19-nortestosterone (nandrolone) is illustrated below.

== Examples ==
Norsteroid examples include: 19-norpregnane (from pregnane), desogestrel, ethylestrenol, etynodiol diacetate, ethinylestradiol, gestrinone, levonorgestrel, norethisterone (norethindrone), norgestrel, norpregnatriene (from pregnatriene), quinestrol, 19-norprogesterone (from a progesterone), nomegestrol acetate, 19-nortestosterone (from a testosterone), and norethisterone acetate.

| progesterone | 19-norprogesterone |
| testosterone | nandrolone (nortestosterone) |

== Ganonorsterone A ==
In 2023 under the guidance of the Zhao research group from the Henan University of Chinese Medicine, in Zhengzhou, China, they discovered the compound ganonorsterone A. Obtained as a colorless oil, this compound was proved to be a dicyclic norsteroid. Using analysis of nuclear magnetic resonance (NMR) data along with high-performance liquid chromatography (HPLC), and electronic circular dichroism (ECD) it was concluded the formula of the compound to be C_{19}H_{28}O_{2}. This compound exhibited moderate inhibition on nitric oxide production in macrophages demonstrating potential anti-inflammatory activity; however, no cytotoxicity, or the ability to damage or kill cells, was discovered against five human cancer cell lines including but not limited to HL-60 (acute promyelocytic leukemia), SMMC-7721 (hepatocellular carcinoma), A549 (lung adenocarcinoma), MCF-7 (breast adenocarcinoma), and SW-480 (colorectal adenocarcinoma).
