= Atamestane =

Chemical compound

Clinical data
- Other names: SH-489; Metandroden; 1-Methylandrosta-1,4-diene-3,17-dione
- Routes of administration: By mouth
- ATC code: None

Legal status
- Legal status: UK: Class C

Identifiers
- IUPAC name: (8R,9S,10S,13S,14S)-1,10,13-Trimethyl-7,8,9,11,12, 14,15,16-octahydro-6H-cyclopenta[a]phenanthrene-3,17-dione
- CAS Number: 96301-34-7
- PubChem CID: 57050
- ChemSpider: 51438
- UNII: 62GA3K28B6
- ChEMBL: ChEMBL2105987
- CompTox Dashboard (EPA): DTXSID30869268

Chemical and physical data
- Formula: C_{20}H_{26}O_{2}
- Molar mass: 298.426 g·mol^{−1}
- 3D model (JSmol): Interactive image
- SMILES: O=C\1/C=C(/C)[C@]4(C(=C/1)/CC[C@@H]3[C@@H]4CC[C@@]2(C(=O)CC[C@H]23)C)C
- InChI: InChI=1S/C20H26O2/c1-12-10-14(21)11-13-4-5-15-16-6-7-18(22)19(16,2)9-8-17(15)20(12,13)3/h10-11,15-17H,4-9H2,1-3H3/t15-,16-,17-,19-,20-/m0/s1; Key:PEPMWUSGRKINHX-TXTPUJOMSA-N

Atamestane (developmental code name SH-489), also known as metandroden, as well as 1-methylandrosta-1,4-diene-3,17-dione, is a steroidal aromatase inhibitor that was studied in the treatment of cancer. It blocks the production of estrogen in the body. The drug is selective, competitive, and irreversible in its inhibition of aromatase.

== Synthesis ==
Dof: Reaction of the known compound, androstadienedione, (1) with Gilman reagent followed by acetylation with acetic anhydride gives the enol acetate (2). Bromination with 1,3-dibromo-5,5-dimethylhydantoin gives an intermediate (3) which on treatment with magnesium oxide yields atamestane (4). Alternatively the steroid (5) can be oxidized with benzeneselenol, or PC10380080 (6) can be oxidized with a mixture of chromium trioxide and sulfuric acid.
