= 4-Androstene-3,6,17-trione =

Chemical compound

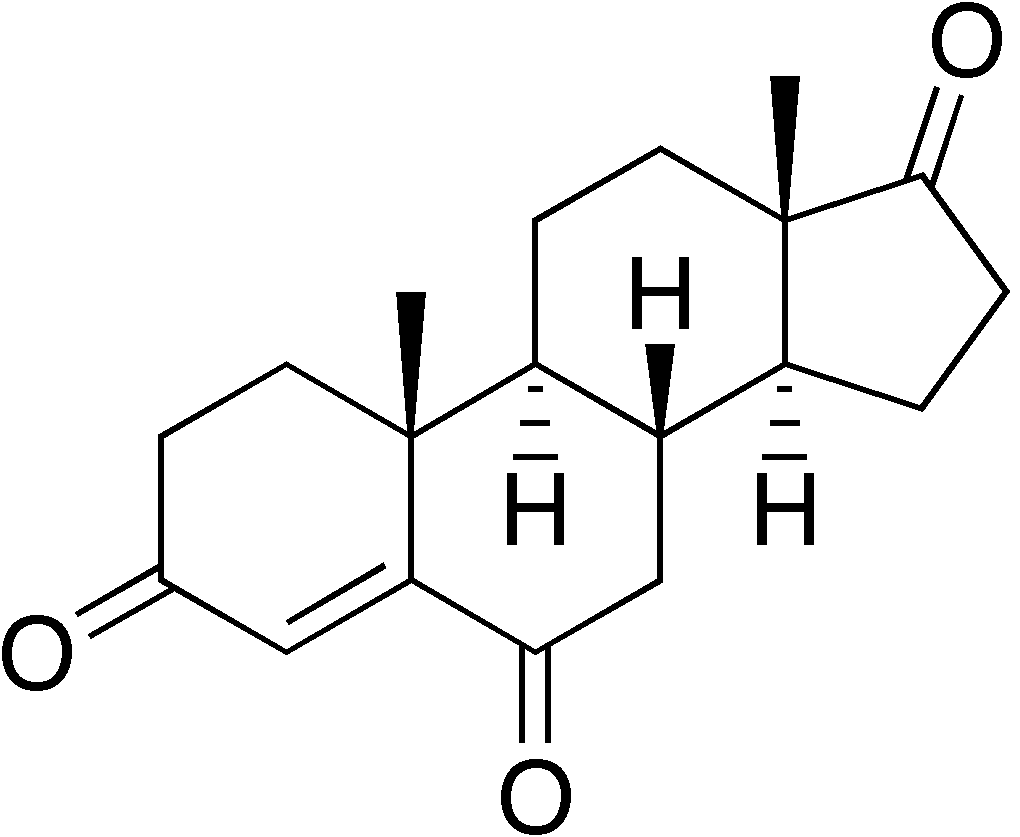

Clinical data
- Routes of administration: By mouth

Legal status
- Legal status: Banned by World Anti-Doping Agency

Identifiers
- IUPAC name: (10R,13S)-10,13-dimethyl- 1,7,8,9,10,11,12,13,15,16-decahydro-2H-cyclopenta[alpha]phenanthrene-3,6,17(14H)-trione
- CAS Number: 2243-06-3
- ChemSpider: 133080
- UNII: L8L0381OBP
- CompTox Dashboard (EPA): DTXSID60862888

Chemical and physical data
- Formula: C_{19}H_{24}O_{3}
- Molar mass: 300.398 g·mol^{−1}
- 3D model (JSmol): Interactive image
- SMILES: O=C4\C1=C\C(=O)CC[C@@]1([C@H]3CC[C@@]2(C(=O)CC[C@H]2[C@@H]3C4)C)C
- InChI: InChI=1S/C19H24O3/c1-18-7-5-11(20)9-15(18)16(21)10-12-13-3-4-17(22)19(13,2)8-6-14(12)18/h9,12-14H,3-8,10H2,1-2H3/t12-,13-,14-,18+,19-/m0/s1; Key:PJMNEPMSGCRSRC-IEVKOWOJSA-N

4-Androstene-3,6,17-trione (4-AT; also marketed as 6-OXO or 4-etioallocholen-3,6,17-trione) is a drug or nutritional supplement that may increase the testosterone-estrogen ratio, but has no proven effect on body composition. Its use can be detected in urine.

4-AT is a potent irreversible aromatase inhibitor that inhibits estrogen biosynthesis by permanently binding and inactivating aromatase in adipose and peripheral tissue. Aromatase is responsible for the conversion of testosterone to estradiol. Blocking aromatase causes the body to decrease in levels of estradiol, which then results in increase of LH and consequently, testosterone. Since testosterone has myotropic activity and estradiol does not, elevated testosterone levels increase muscle mass. However, there appear to be no human or animal studies testing the hypothesis that 4-AT will produce an anabolic effect.

4-AT is used by steroid or prohormone users to counteract estrogen level increases caused by aromatization during their steroid cycle. This helps minimize side effects such as gynecomastia but can lead to acne. Also, after a steroid cycle, the compound may be used to shorten the recovery from the testicular suppression that can be the result of the use of steroids.

Baylor University conducted an eight-week study to determine the effects of 300 mg or 600 mg of 4-AT in resistance-trained males. Compared to baseline, free testosterone increased by 90% for 300 mg group and 84% for 600 mg group, respectively. Also dihydrotestosterone and the ratio of free testosterone to estradiol increased significantly. The report concluded that "[t]he results of this study indicate that eight weeks of 6-OXO supplementation had no effect on body composition or clinical safety markers, but incompletely inhibited aromatase activity and significantly increased endogenous DHT levels that were attenuated after a three-week washout period". This study did not utilize a control group and was funded in part by two producers of commercial 4-AT.

In a FDA Warning Letter dated July 7, 2006, the U.S. Food and Drug Administration (FDA) argues that marketing of 4-AT violates the Federal Food, Drug, and Cosmetic Act and as such products containing it are adulterated by legal definition.

In 2008, Health Canada issued a warning that 4-AT had a health risk related to blood clotting and recommended all users immediately cease use.
