= Bolandiol =

Chemical compound

Clinical data
- Other names: 19-Norandrostenediol; 19-Nor-4-androstene-3β,17β-diol; Estr-4-ene-3β,17β-diol; 3β-Dihydronandrolone

Identifiers
- IUPAC name: (3S,8R,9S,10R,13S,14S,17S)-13-methyl-1,2,3,6,7,8,9,10,11,12,14,15,16,17-tetradecahydrocyclopenta[a]phenanthrene-3,17-diol
- CAS Number: 19793-20-5
- PubChem CID: 9835303
- ChemSpider: 8011024
- UNII: 49SD6G16U5
- ChEBI: CHEBI:145661
- ChEMBL: ChEMBL2106664
- CompTox Dashboard (EPA): DTXSID9041027

Chemical and physical data
- Formula: C_{18}H_{28}O_{2}
- Molar mass: 276.420 g·mol^{−1}
- 3D model (JSmol): Interactive image
- SMILES: O[C@@H]4/C=C2\[C@@H]([C@H]1CC[C@@]3([C@@H](O)CC[C@H]3[C@@H]1CC2)C)CC4
- InChI: InChI=1S/C18H28O2/c1-18-9-8-14-13-5-3-12(19)10-11(13)2-4-15(14)16(18)6-7-17(18)20/h10,12-17,19-20H,2-9H2,1H3/t12-,13-,14+,15+,16-,17-,18-/m0/s1; Key:CMXKUJNZWYTFJN-XFUVECHXSA-N

Bolandiol (INN, also known as 19-nor-4-androstenediol, estr-4-ene-3β,17β-diol, or 3β-dihydronandrolone) is an anabolic-androgenic steroid (AAS) that was never marketed. However, a dipropionate ester derivative, bolandiol dipropionate, has been marketed. Bolandiol and its dipropionate ester are unique among AASs in that they reportedly also possesses estrogenic and progestogenic activity.

Bolandiol is on the World Anti-Doping Agency's list of prohibited substances, and is therefore banned from use in most major sports. It is a potential metabolic precursor (via 3β-HSD) to nandrolone or a derivative of nandrolone (via 3β-hydroxy-steroid:NADP^{+} 3-oxidoreductase). However, several clinical studies have concluded that bolandiol does not alter strength, body composition, or exercise performance.

== See also ==
- 4-Androstenediol
- 19-Nor-5-androstenediol
- 19-Nor-5-androstenedione
- Bolandione (19-nor-4-androstenedione)
- Bolenol (17α-ethyl-19-nor-5-androstenol)
