= Oxymesterone =

Chemical compound

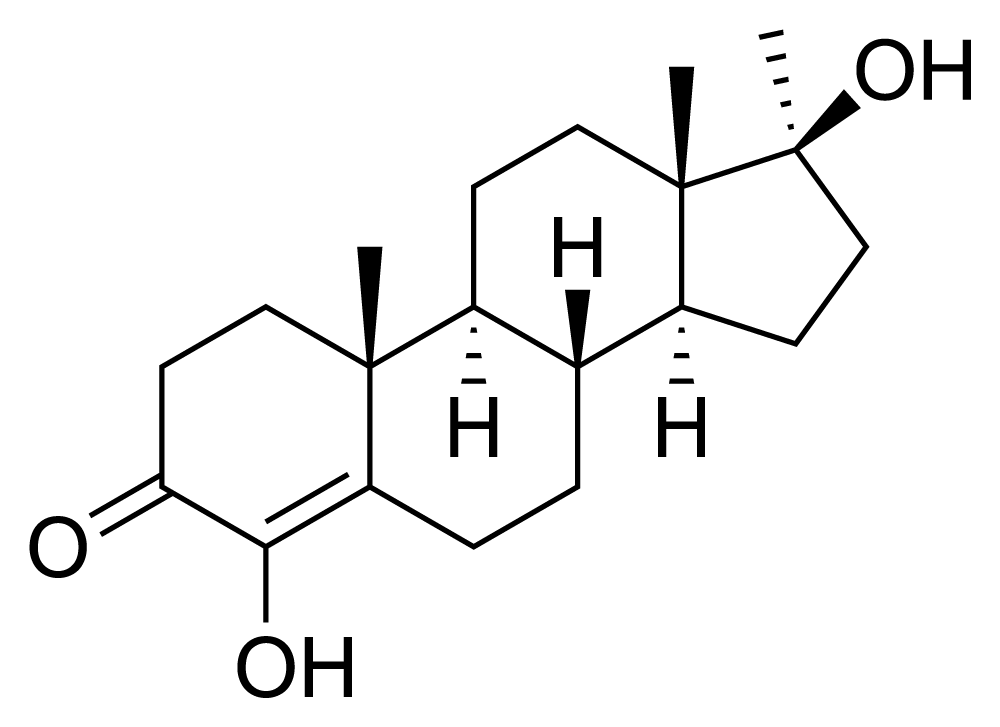

Clinical data
- Trade names: Anamidol, Balnimax, Oranabol, Sanaboral, Theranabol, Tubil
- Other names: Oxymestrone; Ossimesterone; Methandrostenediolone; 4-Hydroxy-17α-methyltestosterone; 17α-Methylandrost-4-en-4,17β-diol-3-one; 4,17β-Dihydroxy-17α-methylandrost-4-en-3-one
- Routes of administration: By mouth

Legal status
- Legal status: BR: Class C5 (Anabolic steroids)

Identifiers
- IUPAC name: (8R,9S,10R,13S,14S,17S)-4,17-dihydroxy-10,13,17-trimethyl-2,6,7,8,9,11,12,14,15,16-decahydro-1H-cyclopenta[a]phenanthren-3-one
- CAS Number: 145-12-0
- PubChem CID: 72061
- ChemSpider: 65047
- UNII: 4R73K9MRMX
- KEGG: C14665
- ChEMBL: ChEMBL1908006
- CompTox Dashboard (EPA): DTXSID80878527
- ECHA InfoCard: 100.005.134

Chemical and physical data
- Formula: C_{20}H_{30}O_{3}
- Molar mass: 318.457 g·mol^{−1}
- 3D model (JSmol): Interactive image
- SMILES: C[C@]12CCC(=O)C(=C1CC[C@@H]3[C@@H]2CC[C@]4([C@H]3CC[C@]4(C)O)C)O
- InChI: InChI=1S/C20H30O3/c1-18-9-8-16(21)17(22)15(18)5-4-12-13(18)6-10-19(2)14(12)7-11-20(19,3)23/h12-14,22-23H,4-11H2,1-3H3/t12-,13+,14+,18-,19+,20+/m1/s1; Key:RXXBBHGCAXVBES-XMUHMHRVSA-N

Oxymesterone (INN, BAN) (brand names Anamidol, Balnimax, Oranabol, Sanaboral, Theranabol, Tubil), also known as methandrostenediolone, as well as 4-hydroxy-17α-methyltestosterone or 17α-methylandrost-4-en-4,17β-diol-3-one, is an orally active anabolic-androgenic steroid (AAS). It was known by 1960.
