= 1-Androstenedione =

Chemical compound

Clinical data
- Other names: 5α-Androst-1-ene-3,17-dione
- Routes of administration: Oral

Identifiers
- IUPAC name: (5S,8R,9S,10R,13S,14S)-10,13-dimethyl-5,6,7,8,9,11,12,14,15,16-decahydro-4H-cyclopenta[a]phenanthrene-3,17-dione
- CAS Number: 571-40-4
- PubChem CID: 11196935
- DrugBank: DB01451
- ChemSpider: 9372004
- UNII: C1091EX356
- CompTox Dashboard (EPA): DTXSID60458467

Chemical and physical data
- Formula: C_{19}H_{26}O_{2}
- Molar mass: 286.415 g·mol^{−1}
- 3D model (JSmol): Interactive image
- SMILES: O=C4\C=C/[C@]2([C@@H](CC[C@H]3[C@@H]1CCC(=O)[C@@]1(C)CC[C@H]23)C4)C
- InChI: InChI=1S/C19H26O2/c1-18-9-7-13(20)11-12(18)3-4-14-15-5-6-17(21)19(15,2)10-8-16(14)18/h7,9,12,14-16H,3-6,8,10-11H2,1-2H3/t12-,14-,15-,16-,18-,19-/m0/s1; Key:WJIQCDPCDVWDDE-WZNAKSSCSA-N

1-Androstenedione, or 5α-androst-1-ene-3,17-dione, also known as 4,5α-dihydro-δ^{1}-4-androstenedione, is a synthetic androgen and anabolic steroid. It is a 5α-reduced isomer of the endogenous steroid 4-androstenedione and acts as an androgen prohormone of 1-testosterone (4,5α-dihydro-δ^{1}-testosterone), a derivative of dihydrotestosterone (DHT).

1-Androstenedione is on the World Anti-Doping Agency's list of prohibited substances, and is therefore banned from use in most major sports.

== See also ==
- 1-Androstenediol
