= Chlorodehydromethyltestosterone =

Chemical compound

Clinical data
- Other names: 4-Chlordehydromethyltestosterone; Dehydrochloromethyltestosterone; 4-Chloromethandienone
- Pregnancy category: AU: X (High risk)
- Routes of administration: By mouth
- Drug class: Androgen; anabolic steroid

Legal status
- Legal status: BR: Class C5 (Anabolic steroids); UK: Class C; US: Schedule III

Pharmacokinetic data
- Bioavailability: High
- Metabolism: Liver
- Elimination half-life: 16 hours
- Excretion: Urine

Identifiers
- IUPAC name: 4-Chloro-17β-hydroxy-17α-methylandrosta-1,4-dien-3-one
- CAS Number: 2446-23-3
- PubChem CID: 98521
- ChemSpider: 88972
- UNII: ZPZ473F40K
- CompTox Dashboard (EPA): DTXSID10179216
- ECHA InfoCard: 100.392.451

Chemical and physical data
- Formula: C_{20}H_{27}ClO_{2}
- Molar mass: 334.88 g·mol^{−1}
- 3D model (JSmol): Interactive image
- SMILES: O=C1\C=C/[C@]4(/C(=C1/Cl)CC[C@@H]3[C@@H]4CC[C@]2([C@H]3CC[C@@]2(O)C)C)C
- InChI: InChI=1S/C20H27ClO2/c1-18-9-8-16(22)17(21)15(18)5-4-12-13(18)6-10-19(2)14(12)7-11-20(19,3)23/h8-9,12-14,23H,4-7,10-11H2,1-3H3/t12-,13+,14+,18-,19+,20+/m1/s1; Key:AGUNEISBPXQOPA-XMUHMHRVSA-N

Chlorodehydromethyltestosterone (CDMT; brand name Oral-Turinabol), also known as 4-chloro-17β-hydroxy-17α-methylandrosta-1,4-dien-3-one, is an anabolic–androgenic steroid (AAS). It is the 4-chloro-substituted derivative of metandienone (dehydromethyltestosterone).

== History ==
CDMT was the first original product of Jenapharm, an East German pharmaceutical company. It was patented in 1961. The idea of combining the structures of 4-chlorotestosterone (clostebol) and metandienone originated with chemist Albert Stachowiak. At the time, this represented a unique dissociation of anabolic from androgenic effects after oral administration. The product was introduced for clinical use in 1965 and remained in use until 1994, when production was discontinued.

== Society and culture ==
=== Doping in sports ===
CDMT was the key steroid administered to approximately ten thousand East German athletes as part of a secret doping program, known as State Plan Topic 14.25, often without them knowing the nature of the "vitamins" they were forced to take. The program remained in place from about 1968 until the collapse of the German Democratic Republic in 1989. In the 1990s, Franke and Berendonk examined GDR archives to elucidate the expansive scope of this operation, which had resulted in numerous medal wins and world-record performances.

Following allegations of widespread doping, the International Olympic Committee reanalyzed samples from the Beijing 2008 and London 2012 Olympic Games using the spectrometric method developed by Grigory Rodchenkov in 2011 for detecting long-lasting metabolites of CDMT. Weightlifters and sprinters in particular were found to have used CDMT.

In August 2017, UFC Light Heavyweight Champion Jon Jones tested positive for turinabol following his victory over Daniel Cormier at UFC 214 the month prior.

Colorado Rockies third baseman Colton Welker tested positive in May 2021 while playing for the Triple-A Albuquerque Isotopes. He was suspended for eighty games.

== See also ==
- Chlorodehydromethylandrostenediol
- Chloromethylandrostenediol
