= 5-Androstenedione =

Chemical compound

Clinical data
- Other names: Androst-5-ene-3,17-dione; Δ^{5}-Androstenedione; NSC-12873
- Routes of administration: Oral

Identifiers
- IUPAC name: (8R,9S,10R,13S,14S)-10,13-Dimethyl-2,4,7,8,9,11,12,14,15,16-decahydro-1H-cyclopenta[a]phenanthrene-3,17-dione
- CAS Number: 571-36-8
- PubChem CID: 160531
- DrugBank: DB01456
- ChemSpider: 141063
- UNII: HEE11L5C3G
- ChEBI: CHEBI:83865
- ChEMBL: ChEMBL1743203

Chemical and physical data
- Formula: C_{19}H_{26}O_{2}
- Molar mass: 286.415 g·mol^{−1}
- 3D model (JSmol): Interactive image
- SMILES: C[C@]12CC[C@H]3[C@@H](CC=C4CC(=O)CC[C@]34C)[C@@H]1CCC2=O
- InChI: InChI=1S/C19H26O2/c1-18-9-7-13(20)11-12(18)3-4-14-15-5-6-17(21)19(15,2)10-8-16(14)18/h3,14-16H,4-11H2,1-2H3/t14-,15-,16-,18-,19-/m0/s1; Key:SQGZFRITSMYKRH-QAGGRKNESA-N

5-Androstenedione, also known as androst-5-ene-3,17-dione, is a prohormone of testosterone. The World Anti-Doping Agency prohibits its use in athletes. In the United States, it is a controlled substance.

5-Androstenedione is structurally similar to 4-androstenedione, with the exception of the position of a carbon-carbon double bond.

4-Androstenedione is naturally produced in the body by the adrenal glands and gonads. In addition to testosterone, it is also a precursor of estrone and estradiol.

5-Androstenedione is on the World Anti-Doping Agency's list of prohibited substances, and is therefore banned from use in most major sports.
