= Bolenol =

Chemical compound

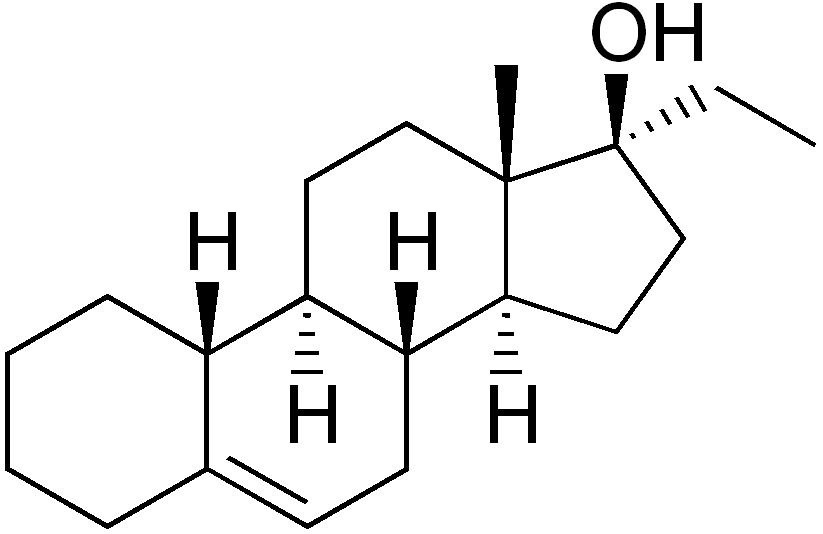

Clinical data
- Other names: Ethylnorandrostenol; 17α-Ethyl-19-norandrost-5-en-17β-ol
- Routes of administration: By mouth

Identifiers
- IUPAC name: (8R,9S,10R,13S,14S,17S)-17-ethyl-13-methyl-2,3,4,7,8,9,10,11,12,14,15, 16-dodecahydro-1H-cyclopenta[a]phenanthren-17-ol
- CAS Number: 16915-78-9
- PubChem CID: 11954311
- ChemSpider: 10128606
- UNII: 1BBD3123X6
- ChEMBL: ChEMBL2104166
- CompTox Dashboard (EPA): DTXSID501028765
- ECHA InfoCard: 100.037.226

Chemical and physical data
- Formula: C_{20}H_{32}O
- Molar mass: 288.475 g·mol^{−1}
- 3D model (JSmol): Interactive image
- SMILES: CC[C@@]1(CC[C@@H]2[C@@]1(CC[C@H]3[C@H]2CC=C4[C@@H]3CCCC4)C)O
- InChI: InChI=1S/C20H32O/c1-3-20(21)13-11-18-17-9-8-14-6-4-5-7-15(14)16(17)10-12-19(18,20)2/h8,15-18,21H,3-7,9-13H2,1-2H3/t15-,16+,17+,18-,19-,20-/m0/s1; Key:VGXLQFPZGUQVQW-XGXHKTLJSA-N

Bolenol (INN, USAN), also known as 17α-ethyl-19-norandrost-5-en-17β-ol (ethylnorandrostenol), is a synthetic, orally active anabolic-androgenic steroid (AAS) and a 17α-alkylated derivative of 19-nortestosterone (nandrolone) that was never marketed. It was described in the literature in 1969.

For the synthesis of Bolenol consult the Cingestol page.

== See also ==
- Bolandiol
- Methandriol
- Propetandrol
- Penmesterol
