= 1-Androstenediol =

Chemical compound

Clinical data
- ATC code: None

Identifiers
- IUPAC name: (3R,5S,8R,9S,10R,13S,14S,17S)-10,13-Dimethyl-4,5,6,7,8,9,11,12,14,15,16,17-dodecahydro-3H-cyclopenta[a]phenanthrene-3,17-diol
- CAS Number: 5323-27-3
- PubChem CID: 11300765
- DrugBank: DB01503
- ChemSpider: 9475742
- UNII: V7W74907I7
- CompTox Dashboard (EPA): DTXSID60627737

Chemical and physical data
- Formula: C_{19}H_{30}O_{2}
- Molar mass: 290.447 g·mol^{−1}
- 3D model (JSmol): Interactive image
- SMILES: C[C@]12CC[C@H]3[C@H]([C@@H]1CC[C@@H]2O)CC[C@@H]4[C@@]3(C=C[C@@H](C4)O)C
- InChI: InChI=1S/C19H30O2/c1-18-9-7-13(20)11-12(18)3-4-14-15-5-6-17(21)19(15,2)10-8-16(14)18/h7,9,12-17,20-21H,3-6,8,10-11H2,1-2H3/t12-,13-,14-,15-,16-,17-,18-,19-/m0/s1; Key:RZFGPAMUAXASRE-YSZCXEEOSA-N

1-Androstenediol, or 5α-androst-1-ene-3β,17β-diol, also known as 4,5α-dihydro-δ^{1}-4-androstenediol, is a prohormone of 1-testosterone (Δ^{1}-DHT). It has been used as a dietary supplement, and is identified by the World Anti-Doping Agency as a prohibited substance related to anabolic steroids.

== See also ==
- 1-Androstenedione
