= 1-Testosterone =

Chemical compound

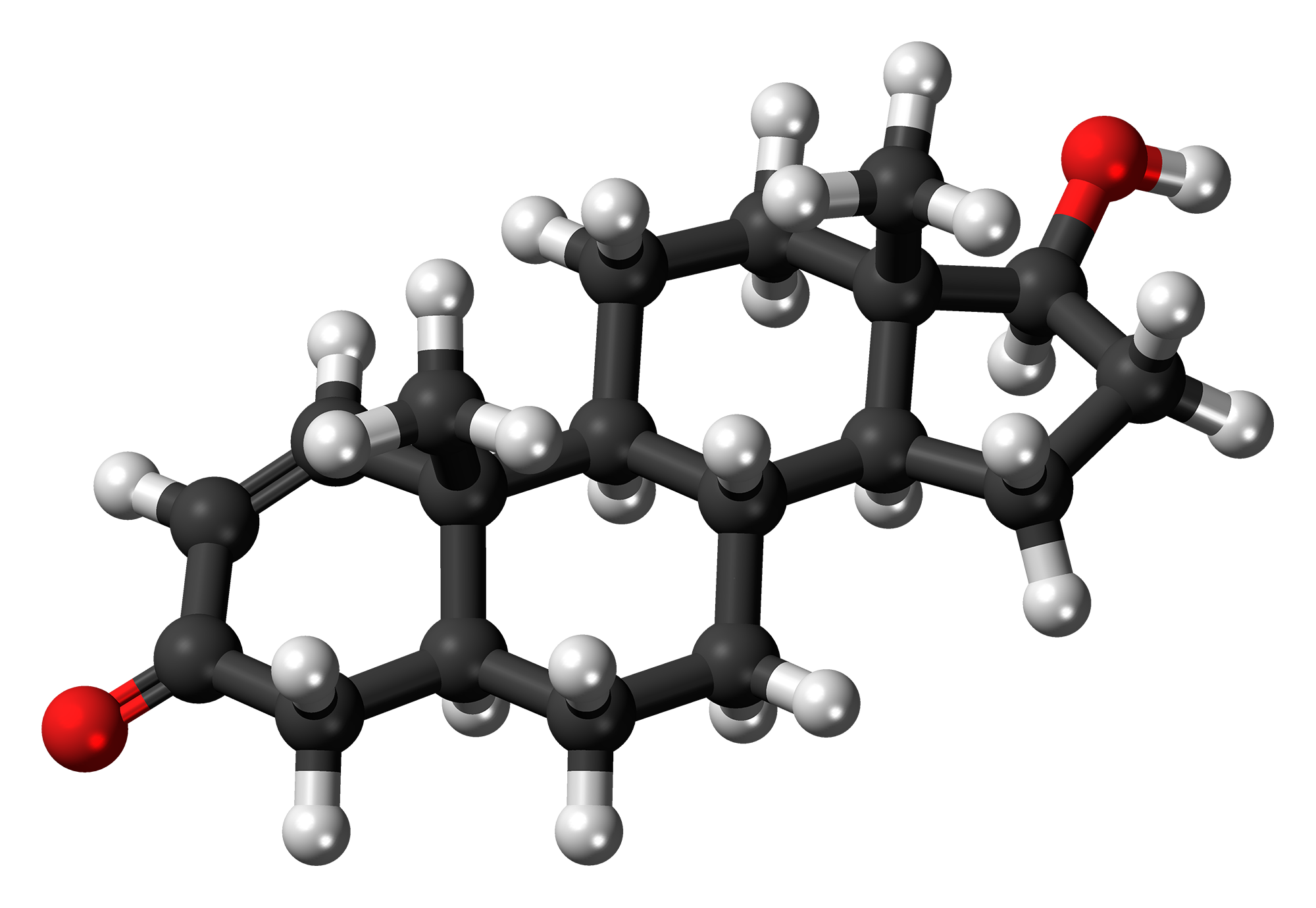

Clinical data
- Other names: 1-Testo; 1-T; δ^{1}-Dihydrotestosterone; δ^{1}-DHT; Dihydroboldenone
- Drug class: Androgen; Anabolic steroid

Legal status
- Legal status: US: Schedule III

Pharmacokinetic data
- Metabolism: Liver
- Excretion: Urine

Identifiers
- IUPAC name: (5S,8R,9S,10R,13S,14S,17S)-17-hydroxy-10,13-dimethyl-4,5,6,7,8,9,11,12,14,15,16,17-dodecahydrocyclopenta[a]phenanthren-3-one
- CAS Number: 65-06-5
- PubChem CID: 579094
- DrugBank: DB01481
- ChemSpider: 206590
- UNII: Y984BV1Q0G
- ChEBI: CHEBI:59714
- CompTox Dashboard (EPA): DTXSID80215312
- ECHA InfoCard: 100.164.058

Chemical and physical data
- Formula: C_{19}H_{28}O_{2}
- Molar mass: 288.431 g·mol^{−1}
- 3D model (JSmol): Interactive image
- SMILES: O=C4\C=C/[C@]1([C@@H](CC[C@@H]2[C@@H]1CC[C@@]3([C@@H](O)CC[C@@H]23)C)C4)C
- InChI: InChI=1S/C19H28O2/c1-18-9-7-13(20)11-12(18)3-4-14-15-5-6-17(21)19(15,2)10-8-16(14)18/h7,9,12,14-17,21H,3-6,8,10-11H2,1-2H3/t12-,14-,15-,16-,17-,18-,19-/m0/s1; Key:OKJCFMUGMSVJBG-ABEVXSGRSA-N

1-Testosterone (abbreviated and nicknamed as 1-Testo, 1-T), also known as δ^{1}-dihydrotestosterone (δ^{1}-DHT), as well as dihydroboldenone, is a synthetic anabolic–androgenic steroid (AAS) and a 5α-reduced derivative of boldenone (Δ1-testosterone). It differs from testosterone by having a 1(2)-double bond instead of a 4(5)-double bond in its A ring. It was legally sold online in the United States until 2005, when it was reclassified as a Schedule III drug.

== Pharmacology ==
=== Pharmacodynamics ===
A 2006 study determined that 1-testosterone has a high androgenic and anabolic potency even without being metabolized, so it can be characterized as a typical anabolic steroid. 1-Testosterone binds in a manner that is highly selective to the androgen receptor (AR) and has a high potency to stimulate AR-dependent transactivation. In vivo, an equimolar dose of 1-testosterone has the same potency to stimulate the growth of the prostate, the seminal vesicles and the androgen-sensitive levator ani muscle as the reference anabolic steroid testosterone propionate, but, unlike testosterone propionate, 1-testosterone also increases liver weight. (The referenced study did not include humans, only animals).

== Chemistry ==
1-Testosterone, IUPAC name 17β-hydroxy-5α-androst-1-en-3-one, also known as 4,5α-dihydro-δ^{1}-testosterone (Δ^{1}-DHT) or as 5α-androst-1-en-17β-ol-3-one, is a synthetic androstane steroid and a derivative of dihydrotestosterone (DHT).

=== Derivatives ===
Two prohormones of 1-testosterone are 1-androstenediol and 1-androstenedione, the latter of which may be synthesized from stanolone acetate.

=== Detection in body fluids ===
Doping with 1-testosterone can be detected in urine samples using gas chromatography.
