= 4-Androstenediol =

Chemical compound

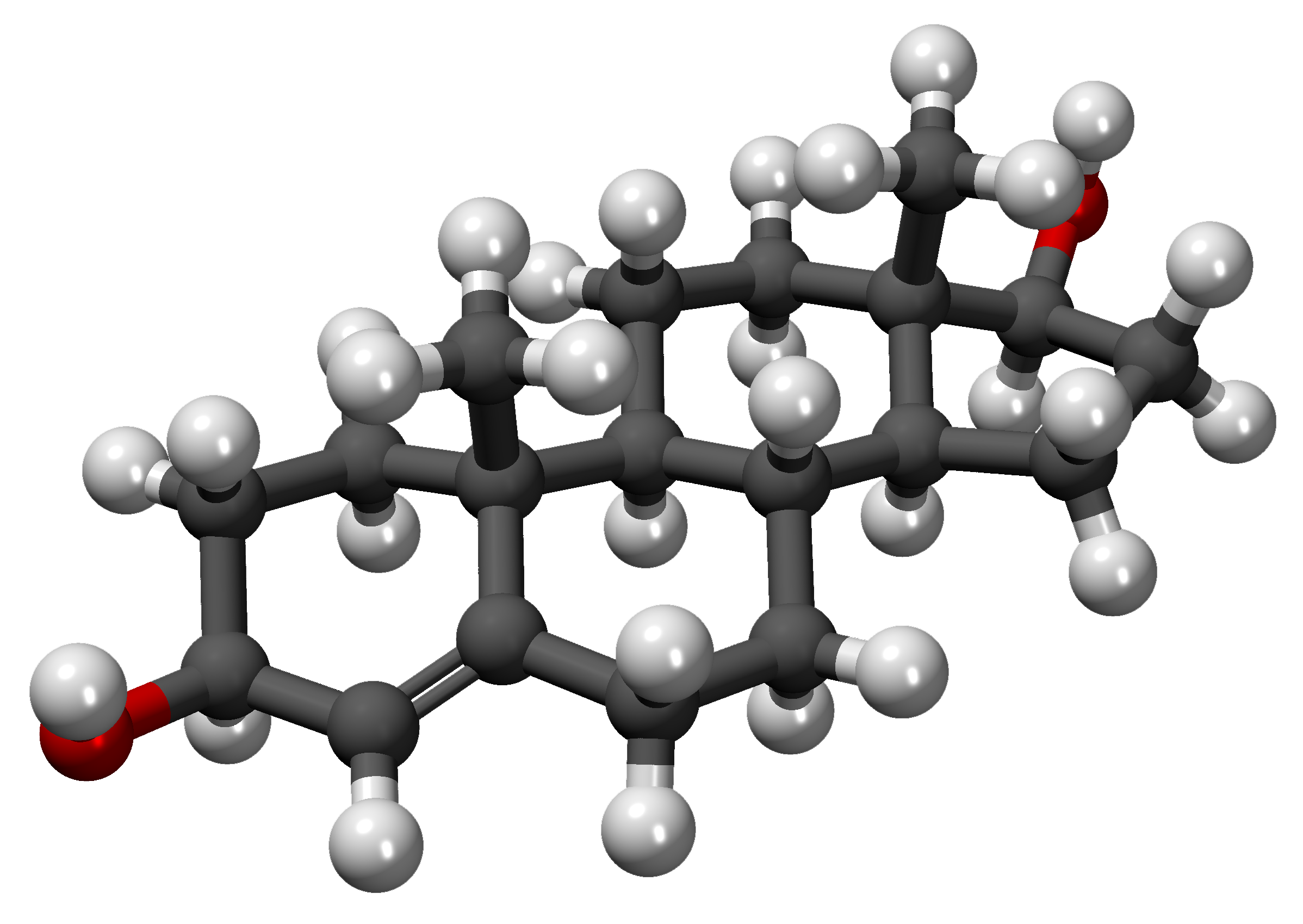

Clinical data
- Other names: Androst-4-ene-3β,17β-diol
- Routes of administration: Oral

Identifiers
- IUPAC name: (3S,8R,9S,10R,13S,14S,17S)-10,13-dimethyl-2,3,6,7,8,9,11,12,14,15,16,17-dodecahydro-1H-cyclopenta[a]phenanthrene-3,17-diol
- CAS Number: 1156-92-9
- PubChem CID: 136297
- DrugBank: DB01526
- ChemSpider: 120071
- UNII: G10EHA9I0D
- ChEMBL: ChEMBL195836
- CompTox Dashboard (EPA): DTXSID5036505

Chemical and physical data
- Formula: C_{19}H_{30}O_{2}
- Molar mass: 290.447 g·mol^{−1}
- 3D model (JSmol): Interactive image
- SMILES: C[C@]12CC[C@H]3[C@H]([C@@H]1CC[C@@H]2O)CCC4=C[C@H](CC[C@]34C)O
- InChI: InChI=1S/C19H30O2/c1-18-9-7-13(20)11-12(18)3-4-14-15-5-6-17(21)19(15,2)10-8-16(14)18/h11,13-17,20-21H,3-10H2,1-2H3/t13-,14-,15-,16-,17-,18-,19-/m0/s1; Key:BTTWKVFKBPAFDK-LOVVWNRFSA-N

4-Androstenediol, also known as androst-4-ene-3β,17β-diol, is an androstenediol that is converted to testosterone. The conversion rate is about 15.76%, almost triple that of 4-androstenedione, due to utilization of a different enzymatic pathway. There is also some conversion into estrogen, since testosterone is the metabolic precursor of the estrogens.

4-Androstenediol is closer to testosterone structurally than 5-androstenediol, and has androgenic effects, acting as a weak partial agonist of the androgen receptor. However, due to its lower intrinsic activity in comparison, in the presence of full agonists like testosterone or dihydrotestosterone (DHT), 4-androstenediol has antagonistic actions, behaving more like an antiandrogen.

4-Androstenediol is very weakly estrogenic. It has approximately 0.5% and 0.6% of the affinity of estradiol at the ERα and ERβ, respectively.

== Medical and commercial use ==
Patrick Arnold holds a 1999 patent on "Use of 4-androstenediol to increase testosterone levels in humans".
