= Androstenedione =

Endogenous weak androgen

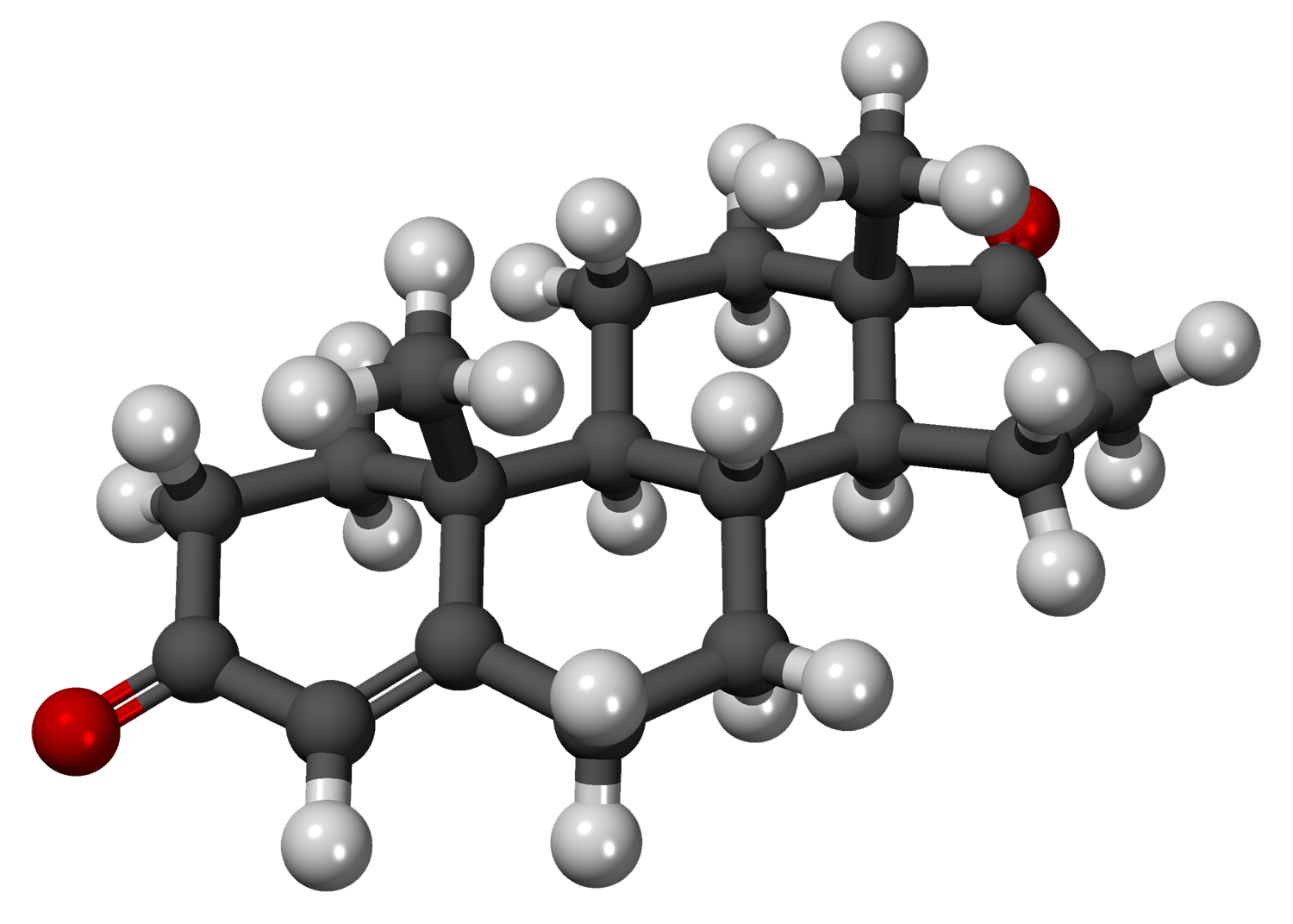

Clinical data
- Other names: A4; Δ^{4}-dione; Androstenedione; Androst-4-ene-3,17-dione; 4-Androstene-3,17-dione; 17-Ketotestosterone; 17-Oxotestosterone; 3,17-Dioxoandrost-4-ene; Fecundin
- Routes of administration: By mouth
- Drug class: Androgen; Anabolic steroid
- ATC code: None

Legal status
- Legal status: US: Schedule III

Pharmacokinetic data
- Metabolism: Liver

Identifiers
- IUPAC name: (8R,9S,10R,13S,14S)-10,13-dimethyl-2,6,7,8,9,11,12,14,15,16-decahydro-1H-cyclopenta[a]phenanthrene-3,17-dione
- CAS Number: 63-05-8
- PubChem CID: 6128
- IUPHAR/BPS: 2860
- DrugBank: DB01536
- ChemSpider: 5898
- UNII: 409J2J96VR
- KEGG: D00051
- ChEBI: CHEBI:16422
- ChEMBL: ChEMBL274826
- CompTox Dashboard (EPA): DTXSID8024523
- ECHA InfoCard: 100.000.504

Chemical and physical data
- Formula: C_{19}H_{26}O_{2}
- Molar mass: 286.415 g·mol^{−1}
- 3D model (JSmol): Interactive image
- Density: 1.11±0.1 g/cm^{3} (predicted) at 20°C and 760 Torr. Calculated using Advanced Chemistry Development (ACD/Labs) Software V11.02 (© 1994-2023 ACD/Labs).
- Melting point: 173–174 °C (343–345 °F)
- SMILES: O=C4/C=C3/CC[C@@H]2[C@H](CC[C@@]1(C(=O)CC[C@H]12)C)[C@@]3(C)CC4
- InChI: InChI=1S/C19H26O2/c1-18-9-7-13(20)11-12(18)3-4-14-15-5-6-17(21)19(15,2)10-8-16(14)18/h11,14-16H,3-10H2,1-2H3/t14-,15-,16-,18-,19-/m0/s1; Key:AEMFNILZOJDQLW-QAGGRKNESA-N

Androstenedione, or 4-androstenedione (abbreviated as A4 or Δ^{4}-dione), also known as androst-4-ene-3,17-dione, is an endogenous weak androgen steroid hormone and intermediate in the biosynthesis of estrone and of testosterone from dehydroepiandrosterone (DHEA). It is closely related to androstenediol (androst-5-ene-3β,17β-diol).

== Function ==
Androstenedione is a precursor of testosterone and other androgens, as well as of estrogens like estrone, in the body. In addition to functioning as an endogenous prohormone, androstenedione also has weak androgenic activity in its own right.

Androstenedione has been found to possess some estrogenic activity, similarly to other DHEA metabolites. However, in contrast to androstenediol, its affinity for the estrogen receptors is very low, with less than 0.01% of the affinity of estradiol for both the ERα and ERβ.

=== Adrenarche ===
In children aged 6 to 8 years old, there is a rise in androstenedione secretion along with DHEA during adrenarche. This rise in androstenedione and DHEA is hypothesized to play a crucial role for learning social, cultural and ecological skills, such as the development and understanding of sexual attraction. Furthermore, it is thought that androstenedione plays a role in levels of aggression and competition in boys, as a positive correlation between the two were observed, while testosterone levels were below detection.

== Biochemistry ==
=== Biosynthesis ===
Steroidogenesis. Androstenedione is at center.

Androstenedione is the common precursor of the androgen and estrogen sex hormones.

Androstenedione can be biosynthesized in one of two ways. The primary pathway involves conversion of 17α-hydroxypregnenolone to DHEA by way of 17,20-lyase, with subsequent conversion of DHEA to androstenedione via the enzyme 3β-hydroxysteroid dehydrogenase. The secondary pathway involves conversion of 17α-hydroxyprogesterone, most often a precursor to cortisol, to androstenedione directly by way of 17,20-lyase. Thus, 17,20-lyase is required for the synthesis of androstenedione, whether immediately or one step removed.

Androstenedione is produced in the adrenal glands and the gonads. The production of adrenal androstenedione is governed by adrenocorticotrophic hormone (ACTH), whereas production of gonadal androstenedione is under control by the gonadotropins. In premenopausal women, the adrenal glands and ovaries each produce about half of the total androstenedione (about 3 mg/day). After menopause, androstenedione production is about halved, due primarily to the reduction of the steroid secreted by the ovary. Nevertheless, androstenedione is the principal steroid produced by the postmenopausal ovary.

Some androstenedione is also secreted into the plasma, and may be converted in peripheral tissues to testosterone and estrogens.

Production rates, secretion rates, clearance rates, and blood levels of major sex hormones
Sex	Sex hormone	Reproductive phase	Blood production rate	Gonadal secretion rate	Metabolic clearance rate	Reference range (serum levels)	
Sex	Sex hormone	Reproductive phase	Blood production rate	Gonadal secretion rate	Metabolic clearance rate	Molar concentration	Mass concentration
Men	Androstenedione	–	2.8 mg/day	1.6 mg/day	2200 L/day	2.8–7.3 nmol/L	80–210 ng/dL
Men	Testosterone	–	6.5 mg/day	6.2 mg/day	950 L/day	6.9–34.7 nmol/L	200–1000 ng/dL
Men	Estrone	–	150 μg/day	110 μg/day	2050 L/day	37–250 pmol/L	10–70 pg/mL
Men	Estradiol	–	60 μg/day	50 μg/day	1600 L/day	<37–210 pmol/L	10–57 pg/mL
Men	Estrone sulfate	–	80 μg/day	Insignificant	167 L/day	600–2500 pmol/L	200–900 pg/mL
Women	Androstenedione	–	3.2 mg/day	2.8 mg/day	2000 L/day	3.1–12.2 nmol/L	89–350 ng/dL
Women	Testosterone	–	190 μg/day	60 μg/day	500 L/day	0.7–2.8 nmol/L	20–81 ng/dL
Women	Estrone	Follicular phase	110 μg/day	80 μg/day	2200 L/day	110–400 pmol/L	30–110 pg/mL
Women	Estrone	Luteal phase	260 μg/day	150 μg/day	2200 L/day	310–660 pmol/L	80–180 pg/mL
Women	Estrone	Postmenopause	40 μg/day	Insignificant	1610 L/day	22–230 pmol/L	6–60 pg/mL
Women	Estradiol	Follicular phase	90 μg/day	80 μg/day	1200 L/day	<37–360 pmol/L	10–98 pg/mL
Women	Estradiol	Luteal phase	250 μg/day	240 μg/day	1200 L/day	699–1250 pmol/L	190–341 pg/mL
Women	Estradiol	Postmenopause	6 μg/day	Insignificant	910 L/day	<37–140 pmol/L	10–38 pg/mL
Women	Estrone sulfate	Follicular phase	100 μg/day	Insignificant	146 L/day	700–3600 pmol/L	250–1300 pg/mL
Women	Estrone sulfate	Luteal phase	180 μg/day	Insignificant	146 L/day	1100–7300 pmol/L	400–2600 pg/mL
Women	Progesterone	Follicular phase	2 mg/day	1.7 mg/day	2100 L/day	0.3–3 nmol/L	0.1–0.9 ng/mL
Women	Progesterone	Luteal phase	25 mg/day	24 mg/day	2100 L/day	19–45 nmol/L	6–14 ng/mL
Notes and sources Notes: "The concentration of a steroid in the circulation is determined by the rate at which it is secreted from glands, the rate of metabolism of precursor or prehormones into the steroid, and the rate at which it is extracted by tissues and metabolized. The secretion rate of a steroid refers to the total secretion of the compound from a gland per unit time. Secretion rates have been assessed by sampling the venous effluent from a gland over time and subtracting out the arterial and peripheral venous hormone concentration. The metabolic clearance rate of a steroid is defined as the volume of blood that has been completely cleared of the hormone per unit time. The production rate of a steroid hormone refers to entry into the blood of the compound from all possible sources, including secretion from glands and conversion of prohormones into the steroid of interest. At steady state, the amount of hormone entering the blood from all sources will be equal to the rate at which it is being cleared (metabolic clearance rate) multiplied by blood concentration (production rate = metabolic clearance rate × concentration). If there is little contribution of prohormone metabolism to the circulating pool of steroid, then the production rate will approximate the secretion rate." Sources: See template.

=== Metabolism ===
Androstenedione is converted to either testosterone or estrone. Conversion of androstenedione to testosterone requires the enzyme 17β-hydroxysteroid dehydrogenase. Androstenedione is released into the blood by theca cells. Conversion of androstenedione to estrone requires the enzyme aromatase. Androstenedione is a substrate for estrogen production in granulosa cells which produce aromatase. Thus, theca cells and granulosa cells work together to form estrogens.

Androstanedione is a 5α-reduced metabolite of 4-androstenedione which serves as an intermediate in the biosynthesis of the androgen and neurosteroid androsterone.

Androstenedione also has a variety of metabolites in different species. In cattle, androstenedione is converted into oestradiol-17 and epitestosterone. In sheep, the molecule is transformed into the 17-epimer. Androstenedione is converted into different metabolites in invertebrates. As is the case for Marisa cornuarietis, freshwater ramshorn snail, where androstenedione is converted into 5α-dihydrotestosterone (DHT) and testosterone (T) in male and into 5α-dihydroandrostenedione (DHA) in females.

=== Levels ===
Levels are normally 30–200 ng/dL (1.0–7.0 nmol/L) in females and 40–150 ng/dL (1.4–5.2 nmol/L) in males.

In premature infants, serum androstenedione levels hover between 80 and 446 ng/dL. In full-term newborns, levels range from 20 to 290 ng/dL, and between 1 month and 1 year old, serum levels typically stay at less than 69 ng/dL.

Serum levels of androstenedione greater than or equal to 500 ng/dL may indicate the presence of an adrenal or gonadal tumor.

== Pharmacology ==
Androstenedione has been shown to increase serum testosterone levels over an eight-hour period in men when taken as a single oral dose of 300 mg per day, but a dose of 100 mg had no significant effect on serum testosterone. However, serum levels of estradiol increased following both the 100 mg and 300 mg doses. The study also reported that the serum level of estrogens and testosterone produced varied widely between individuals.

A 2006 review paper summarized several studies that examined the effect of androstenedione on strength training. At dosages of 50 mg or 100 mg per day, androstenedione had no effect on muscle strength or size, or on body fat levels. One study used a daily dosage of 300 mg of androstenedione combined with several other supplements, and also found no increase in strength when compared to a control group that did not take the supplements.

The review authors speculate that sufficiently high doses may indeed lead to increased muscle size and strength. However, due to the federal ban on androstenedione supplements, it is difficult to carry out new research on its effects. The review authors conclude that individuals should not use androstenedione supplements due to the lack of evidence of beneficial effects, the wide variation in individual responses to the supplement, and the risk of unknown side effects. Side effects for women may include the development of male characteristics, clitoromegaly, voice deepening, hirsutism, abnormal menstrual cycles and abnormal bleeding, blood clots, and metabolic disruption based on a study following 10 healthy females administering 100 mg androstenedione.

== Medical use ==
Under the brand name Metharmon-F and in combination with sex steroids (pregnenolone, testosterone, estrone, androstenediol) and thyroid hormone (desiccated thyroid), androstenedione is or has been marketed for medical use in Thailand.

== Chemistry ==
Androstenedione, also known as androst-4-ene-3,17-dione, is a naturally occurring androstane steroid and a 17-ketosteroid. It is closely related structurally to androstenediol (A5; androst-5-ene-3β,17β-diol), dehydroepiandrosterone (DHEA; androst-5-en-3β-ol-17-one), and testosterone (androst-4-en-17β-ol-3-one), as well as to 5α-androstanedione (5α-androstane-3,17-dione) and estrone (estra-1,3,5(10)-triene-3-ol-17-one or 19-norandrost-1,3,5(10)-triene-3-ol-17-one).

== History ==
=== Use as a supplement ===
Androstenedione was manufactured as a dietary supplement, often called andro or andros for short. Sports Illustrated credits Patrick Arnold with introducing androstenedione to the North American market. Androstenedione supplements are credited with increasing testosterone levels, enhancing athletic performance, building body muscles, reducing fats, increasing energy, maintaining healthy RBCs, and increasing sexual performance. Although, all of these effects have not been proven through scientific study. Androstenedione was legal and able to be purchased over the counter, and, as a consequence, it was in common use in Major League Baseball throughout the 1990s by record-breaking sluggers like Mark McGwire.

Barry R. McCaffrey, in his capacity as director of the White House Office of National Drug Control Policy from 1996 to 2001, determined that androstenedione could not be classified as an anabolic steroid because there is no proof that it promotes muscle growth.

== Society and culture ==
=== Regulation ===
Androstenedione is banned by the World Anti-Doping Agency, and from the Olympic Games. The International Olympic Committee in 1997 banned androstenedione and placed it under the category of androgenic-anabolic steroids. Androstenedione is banned by MLB, the NFL, USOC, NCAA, and by the NBA.

On March 12, 2004, the Anabolic Steroid Control Act of 2004 was introduced into the United States Senate. It amended the Controlled Substances Act to place both anabolic steroids and prohormones on a list of controlled substances, making possession of the banned substances a federal crime. The law took effect on January 20, 2005. However, androstenedione was legally defined as an anabolic steroid, even though there is scant evidence that androstenedione itself is anabolic in nature. On April 11, 2004, the United States Food and Drug Administration banned the sale of androstenedione, citing that the drug poses significant health risks commonly associated with steroids. Androstenedione is currently banned by the U.S. military.
