= Methylstenbolone =

Chemical compound

Clinical data
- Other names: M-Sten; Methyl-Sten; Ultradol; NSC-74234; 2,17α-Dimethyl-δ^{1}-4,5α-dihydrotestosterone; 2,17α-Dimethyl-δ^{1}-DHT; 2,17α-Dimethyl-5α-androst-1-en-17β-ol-3-one
- Routes of administration: intramuscular By mouth
- Drug class: Androgen; Anabolic steroid
- ATC code: None

Pharmacokinetic data
- Bioavailability: 98%

Identifiers
- IUPAC name: (5S,8R,9S,10S,13S,14S,17S)-17-Hydroxy-2,10,13,17-tetramethyl-5,6,7,8,9,11,12,14,15,16-decahydro-4H-cyclopenta[a]phenanthren-3-one
- CAS Number: 6176-38-1
- PubChem CID: 252380
- ChemSpider: 221137
- UNII: SE6T9C1YMB
- ChEBI: CHEBI:79535
- CompTox Dashboard (EPA): DTXSID301045943

Chemical and physical data
- Formula: C_{21}H_{32}O_{2}
- Molar mass: 316.485 g·mol^{−1}
- 3D model (JSmol): Interactive image
- SMILES: CC1=C[C@]2([C@@H](CC[C@@H]3[C@@H]2CC[C@]4([C@H]3CC[C@]4(C)O)C)CC1=O)C
- InChI: InChI=1S/C21H32O2/c1-13-12-19(2)14(11-18(13)22)5-6-15-16(19)7-9-20(3)17(15)8-10-21(20,4)23/h12,14-17,23H,5-11H2,1-4H3/t14-,15+,16-,17-,19-,20-,21-/m0/s1; Key:TVTSDURKYARCML-IYRCEVNGSA-N

Methylstenbolone, known by the nicknames M-Sten, Methyl-Sten, and Ultradrol, is a synthetic and orally active anabolic–androgenic steroid (AAS) and a 17α-methylated derivative of dihydrotestosterone (DHT) which was never introduced for medical use. It is a designer steroid and has been sold via the internet marketed as a dietary/nutritional supplement.

== Chemistry ==
Methylstenbolone, also known as 2,17α-dimethyl-δ^{1}-4,5α-dihydrotestosterone (2,17α-dimethyl-δ^{1}-DHT) or as 2,17α-dimethyl-5α-androst-1-en-17β-ol-3-one, is a synthetic androstane steroid and a 17α-alkylated derivative of DHT. It is the 17α-methylated derivative of stenbolone, as well as the δ^{1}-isomer of methasterone (2α,17α-dimethyl-DHT). Related AAS include mestanolone and methyl-1-testosterone.
