= C20H32N2O =

The molecular formula C_{20}H_{32}N_{2}O (molar mass: 316.48 g/mol, exact mass: 316.2515 u) may refer to:

- JNJ-5207852
- Methyldiazinol, or 3-azi-17α-methyl-DHT
