= C26H40O3 =

The molecular formula C_{26}H_{40}O_{3} may refer to:

- Mesabolone, or 1-testosterone 17β-methoxycyclopentyl ether
- Prasterone enanthate
- Testosterone enanthate
- Trestolone enanthate
