= Mestanolone =

Chemical compound

Clinical data
- Trade names: Androstalone, Ermalone, others
- Other names: RU-143; Methylandrostanolone; Methyldihydrotestosterone; Methyl-DHT; 17α-Methyl-4,5α-dihydrotestosterone; 17α-Methyl-DHT; 17α-Methyl-5α-androstan-17β-ol-3-one;
- AHFS/Drugs.com: International Drug Names
- Routes of administration: By mouth
- Drug class: Androgen; Anabolic steroid
- ATC code: None

Legal status
- Legal status: US: Schedule III

Pharmacokinetic data
- Metabolism: Liver
- Excretion: Urine

Identifiers
- IUPAC name: (5S,8R,9S,10S,13S,14S,17S)-17-hydroxy-10,13,17-trimethyl-2,4,5,6,7,8,9,11,12,14,15,16-dodecahydro-1H-cyclopenta[a]phenanthren-3-one
- CAS Number: 521-11-9
- PubChem CID: 10633
- ChemSpider: 10187
- UNII: S712YZ168E
- KEGG: D01533
- ChEMBL: ChEMBL261514
- CompTox Dashboard (EPA): DTXSID0048973
- ECHA InfoCard: 100.007.549

Chemical and physical data
- Formula: C_{20}H_{32}O_{2}
- Molar mass: 304.474 g·mol^{−1}
- 3D model (JSmol): Interactive image
- SMILES: O=C2C[C@@H]1CC[C@@H]3[C@@H]([C@@]1(C)CC2)CC[C@]4([C@H]3CC[C@@]4(O)C)C
- InChI: InChI=1S/C20H32O2/c1-18-9-6-14(21)12-13(18)4-5-15-16(18)7-10-19(2)17(15)8-11-20(19,3)22/h13,15-17,22H,4-12H2,1-3H3/t13-,15+,16-,17-,18-,19-,20-/m0/s1; Key:WYZDXEKUWRCKOB-YDSAWKJFSA-N

Mestanolone, also known as methylandrostanolone and sold under the brand names Androstalone and Ermalone among others, is an androgen and anabolic steroid (AAS) medication which is mostly no longer used. It is still available for use in Japan however. It is taken by mouth.

Side effects of mestanolone include symptoms of masculinization like acne, increased hair growth, voice changes, and increased sexual desire. It can also cause liver damage. The drug is a synthetic androgen and anabolic steroid and hence is an agonist of the androgen receptor (AR), the biological target of androgens like testosterone and dihydrotestosterone (DHT). It has strong androgenic effects and weak anabolic effects, which make it useful for producing masculine psychological and behavioral effects. The drug has no estrogenic effects.

Mestanolone was discovered in 1935 and was introduced for medical use in the 1950s. In addition to its medical use, mestanolone has been used to improve physique and performance. It was used in East Germany in Olympic athletes as part of a state-sponsored doping program in the 1970s and 1980s. The drug is a controlled substance in many countries and so non-medical use is generally illicit.

== Medical uses ==
=== Available forms ===
Mestanolone was available in the form of 25 mg sublingual tablets (brand name Ermalone).

== Side effects ==
Side effects of mestanolone include virilization and hepatotoxicity among others.

== Pharmacology ==
=== Pharmacodynamics ===
Mestanolone is an AAS, with both androgenic and anabolic effects. It is very similar in its effects to androstanolone (dihydrotestosterone; DHT), and can be thought of as an orally active version of this AAS. Due to inactivation by 3α-hydroxysteroid dehydrogenase (3α-HSD) in skeletal muscle, mestanolone is described as a very poor anabolic agent, similarly to androstanolone and mesterolone. As mestanolone is 5α-reduced, it cannot be aromatized and hence has no propensity for estrogenic side effects such as gynecomastia. The drug also has no progestogenic activity. Like other 17α-alkylated AAS, mestanolone is hepatotoxic.

=== Pharmacokinetics ===
Due to its C17α methyl group, unlike androstanolone, mestanolone is orally active.

== Chemistry ==
Mestanolone, also known as 17α-methyl-4,5α-dihydrotestosterone (17α-methyl-DHT) or as 17α-methyl-5α-androstan-17β-ol-3-one, is a synthetic androstane steroid and a 17α-alkylated derivative of dihydrotestosterone (DHT). It differs from DHT only by the presence of the methyl group at the C17α position. Close synthetic relatives of mestanolone include oxandrolone (2-oxa-17α-methyl-DHT), oxymetholone (2-hydroxymethylene-17α-methyl-DHT), and stanozolol (a derivative of 17α-methyl-DHT (mestanolone) with a pyrazole ring fused to the A ring).

=== Synthesis ===
The chemical synthesis of mestanolone was reported: Although the Lednicer book method uses DHEA as the starting material, androstenedione is cheaper and more readily available.

The reaction of Androstenedione [63-05-8] (1) with triethyl orthoformate convers the enone into the corresponding enol ether, 3-Ethoxyandrosta-3,5-dien-17-one [972-46-3] (2). Grignard addition of methyl magnesium halide gives (3). Catalytic hydrogenation reduces the C5=C6 olefin giving (4). Hydrolysis of the product in aqueous acid completed the synthesis of mestanolone (5).

=== Applications ===
Mestanolone is used in the chemical synthesis of Methyl-1-testosterone, which in-turn is used to make oxandrolone.

Mestanolone is also used to make Oxymesterone, Methyldiazirinol & Furazabol.

Another use is in the synthesis of Oxymetholone, a compound which itself finds use in the synthesis of stanozolol, Cyanostane, Androisoxazole & Methasterone.

== History ==
Mestanolone was first synthesized in 1935 along with methyltestosterone and methandriol. It was developed by Roussel in the 1950s and was introduced for medical use, under the brand names Androstalone and Ermalone, by at least 1960. It was marketed in Germany. The drug was originally thought to be a potent anabolic agent, but subsequent research showed that it actually has relatively weak anabolic effects and is mostly an androgen. Mestanolone was used as a doping agent in athletes competing in the Olympics from East Germany due to a state-sponsored doping program in the 1970s and 1980s. Its value is said to have been less as a muscle-builder and more as an androgen in the central nervous system and neuromuscular interaction, improving speed, strength, aggression, focus, endurance, and stress resilience. Today, mestanolone has mostly been discontinued in medicine, though it is still available in Japan.

== Society and culture ==
=== Generic names ===
Mestanolone is the generic name of the drug and its INN, BAN, and JAN.

=== Brand names ===
Mestanolone was marketed under the brand names Andoron, Androstalone, Ermalone, Mesanolon, and Notandron among many others.

=== Availability ===
Mestanolone has mostly been discontinued but remains available in Japan.
