= OR51E1 =

Protein-coding gene in the species Homo sapiens

Identifiers
- Aliases: OR51E1, D-GPCR, DGPCR, GPR136, GPR164, OR51E1P, OR52A3P, POGR, PSGR2, olfactory receptor family 51 subfamily E member 1
- External IDs: OMIM: 611267; MGI: 3030392; GeneCards: OR51E1

Gene location (Human)
Chr.	Chromosome 11 (human)
Band	11p15.4	Start	4,643,420 bp
Band	11p15.4	End	4,655,488 bp

Gene location (Mouse)
Chr.	Chromosome 7 (mouse)
Band	7|7 E3	Start	102,351,422 bp
Band	7|7 E3	End	102,361,271 bp
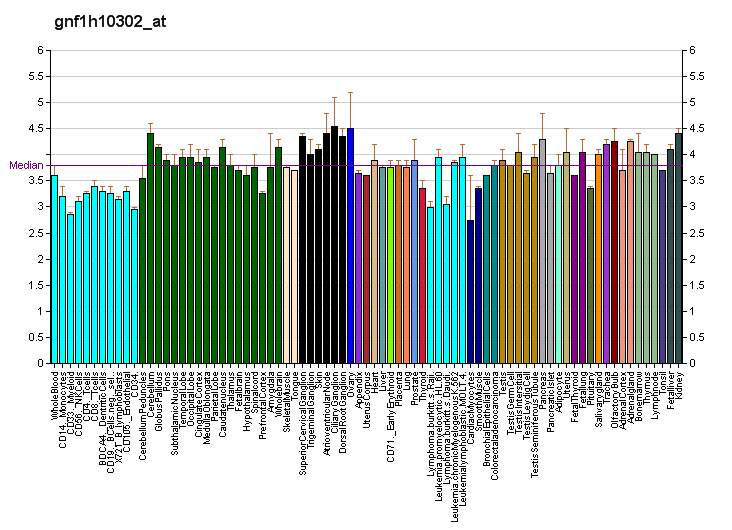
RNA expression pattern
Bgee	Human / Mouse (ortholog); Top expressed in: secondary oocyte; testicle; tibialis anterior muscle; pancreatic ductal cell; apex of heart; mucosa of ileum; popliteal artery; tibial arteries; left ventricle; placenta / Top expressed in: esophagus; muscle of thigh; spermatocyte; right kidney; spermatid; artery; muscle tissue; skeletal muscle tissue; carotid body; major salivary gland; More reference expression data
BioGPS	More reference expression data
Gene ontology
Molecular function	signal transducer activity; olfactory receptor activity; G protein-coupled receptor activity
Cellular component	membrane; integral component of membrane; plasma membrane
Biological process	sensory perception of smell; signal transduction; response to stimulus; detection of chemical stimulus involved in sensory perception of smell; G protein-coupled receptor signaling pathway
Sources:Amigo / QuickGO
Orthologs
Databases	NCBI: entry; OMA: entry
Species	Human	Mouse
Entrez	143503	259097
Ensembl	ENSG00000180785	ENSMUSG00000070423
UniProt	Q8TCB6	Q8VGZ7
RefSeq (mRNA)	NM_152430	NM_147093
RefSeq (protein)	NP_689643	NP_667304
Location (UCSC)	Chr 11: 4.64 – 4.66 Mb	Chr 7: 102.35 – 102.36 Mb
PubMed search
- Wikidata
View/Edit Human	View/Edit Mouse

Olfactory receptor 51E1 is a protein that in humans is encoded by the OR51E1 gene.

Olfactory receptors interact with odorant molecules in the nose, to initiate a neuronal response that triggers the perception of a smell. The olfactory receptor proteins are members of a large family of G-protein-coupled receptors arising from single coding-exon genes. Olfactory receptors share a 7-transmembrane domain structure with many neurotransmitter and hormone receptors and are responsible for the recognition and G protein-mediated transduction of odorant signals. The olfactory receptor gene family is the largest in the genome. The nomenclature assigned to the olfactory receptor genes and proteins for this organism is independent of other organisms.

== Ligands ==
The receptor is associated with some compounds with a "cheese" or "sour" scent note. Examples of compounds that activate OR51E1 include:

- butyl butyryl lactate
- isovaleric acid
- nonanoic acid
- 3-methylpentanoic acid
- 4-methylpentanoic acid

The following are in decreasing order of activity:

- butyric acid
- methyl eugenol
- methyl salicylate
- (+)-menthol
- eugenyl acetate
- 2,4-dinitrotoluene
- pyrazine
- dimethyl disulfide
- methyl furfuryl disulfide
- pentanol
- propanal

== See also ==
- Olfactory receptor
