= Mossman–Pacey paradox =

Paradox about attractiveness and fertility

The Mossman–Pacey paradox is a phenomenon in which certain actions often taken by men to improve their sexual attractiveness end up lowering their fertility.

One of the most prevalent manifestations of this phenomenon is the use of anabolic steroids by some men (particularly if they go to the gym). These steroids can help build larger muscles, but can also lead to side effects such as smaller testicles, erectile dysfunction, and lower sperm count. One of the main reasons for this is that anabolic steroids can stop the pituitary gland producing the hormones LH and FSH. It has been estimated that approximately 90% of anabolic steroid users are at risk of infertility.

== Etymology ==
The term is named after Dr James Mossman and Professor Allan Pacey, who first discovered the phenomenon when they noticed a large number of muscular men needing fertility tests.
