= RU-2309 =

Chemical compound

Clinical data
- Other names: 18-Methylmetribolone; 17α-Methyltetrahydrogestrinone; 17α-Methyl-THG; ∆^{9,11}-17α,18-dimethyl-19-nortestosterone; 17α,18-Dimethylestr-4,9,11-trien-17β-ol-3-one
- Drug class: Androgen; Anabolic steroid

Identifiers
- IUPAC name: (8S,13S,14S,17S)-13-ethyl-17-hydroxy-17-methyl-1,2,6,7,8,14,15,16-octahydrocyclopenta[a]phenanthren-3-one
- CAS Number: 10109-62-3
- PubChem CID: 124385827
- ChemSpider: 23208646

Chemical and physical data
- Formula: C_{20}H_{26}O_{2}
- Molar mass: 298.426 g·mol^{−1}
- 3D model (JSmol): Interactive image
- SMILES: CC[C@]12C=CC3=C4CCC(=O)C=C4CC[C@H]3[C@@H]1CC[C@]2(C)O
- InChI: InChI=1S/C20H26O2/c1-3-20-11-8-16-15-7-5-14(21)12-13(15)4-6-17(16)18(20)9-10-19(20,2)22/h8,11-12,17-18,22H,3-7,9-10H2,1-2H3/t17-,18+,19+,20+/m1/s1; Key:KTIKZXSPPAGDBN-FYQPLNBISA-N

RU-2309, also known as 18-methylmetribolone, δ^{9,11}-17α,18-dimethyl-19-nortestosterone, or 17α,18-dimethylestr-4,9,11-trien-17β-ol-3-one, is a 17α-alkylated androgen/anabolic steroid (AAS) of the 19-nortestosterone group which was never marketed. It is the C18 methyl or C13β ethyl derivative of metribolone. The compound is closely related to tetrahydrogestrinone (THG), which has the same chemical structure as RU-2309 except for possessing an ethyl group at the C17α position instead of a methyl group. Hence, it could also be referred to as 17α-methyl-THG. RU-2309 shows high affinity for the androgen, progesterone, and glucocorticoid receptors.

== See also ==
- List of androgens/anabolic steroids
