= Methoxydienone =

Steroid

Clinical data
- Other names: Methoxygonadiene; 3-Methoxy-17-dehydro-18-methyl-19-nor-δ^{2,5(10)}-testosterone; 13β-Ethyl-3-methoxygona-2,5(10)-dien-17-one; 18-Methyl-19-nor-δ^{2,5(10)}-epiandrosterone 3-methyl ether
- Routes of administration: By mouth

Identifiers
- IUPAC name: (8R,9S,13S,14S)-13-Ethyl-3-methoxy-4,6,7,8,9,11,12,14,15,16-decahydro-1H-cyclopenta[a]phenanthren-17-one
- CAS Number: 2322-77-2
- PubChem CID: 102242
- ChemSpider: 92372
- UNII: 12AU99WIMP

Chemical and physical data
- Formula: C_{20}H_{28}O_{2}
- Molar mass: 300.442 g·mol^{−1}
- 3D model (JSmol): Interactive image
- SMILES: CC[C@]12CC[C@H]3[C@H]([C@@H]1CCC2=O)CCC4=C3CC=C(C4)OC
- InChI: InChI=1S/C20H28O2/c1-3-20-11-10-16-15-7-5-14(22-2)12-13(15)4-6-17(16)18(20)8-9-19(20)21/h5,16-18H,3-4,6-12H2,1-2H3/t16-,17-,18+,20+/m1/s1; Key:PQMRKLSVUBRLLQ-XSYGEPLQSA-N

Methoxydienone, also known as methoxygonadiene, as well as 3-methoxy-17-dehydro-18-methyl-19-nor-δ^{2,5(10)}-testosterone or 13β-ethyl-3-methoxygona-2,5(10)-dien-17-one, is a synthetic anabolic-androgenic steroid (AAS) and progestogen of the 19-nortestosterone group related to levonorgestrel which was never marketed. It was synthesized in the 1960s and 1970s by chemist Herchel Smith and his colleagues while they were developing progestins for use in oral contraceptives. The drug is a potent anabolic when administered via injection with an anabolic:androgenic ratio of approximately 54:27 relative to testosterone propionate and 90:625 relative to nandrolone. Methoxydienone is not 17α-alkylated (instead featuring a ketone at the C17 position) and no data exist regarding its oral activity in humans. It has been sold on the Internet as a designer steroid.

== See also ==
- Bolandione
- Dehydroepiandrosterone
- Dienedione
