= Androisoxazole =

Chemical compound

Clinical data
- Trade names: Androxan, Neo-Ponden, Neo-Pondus
- Other names: 17α-Methyl-5α-androstano[3,2-c]isoxazol-17β-ol
- Routes of administration: By mouth
- Drug class: Androgen; Anabolic steroid

Identifiers
- IUPAC name: 2,3,3a,3b,4,5,5a,6,10,10a,10b,11,12,12a-tetradecahydro-1,10a,12a-trimethyl-1H-cyclopenta[7,8]phenanthro[2,3-c]isoxazol-1-ol
- CAS Number: 360-66-7
- PubChem CID: 9676
- ChemSpider: 9295
- UNII: 6WRG30P3CG
- CompTox Dashboard (EPA): DTXSID40957423

Chemical and physical data
- Formula: C_{21}H_{31}NO_{2}
- Molar mass: 329.484 g·mol^{−1}
- 3D model (JSmol): Interactive image
- SMILES: O[C@@]5(C)CC[C@H]4[C@H]3[C@@H]([C@]2(Cc1c(noc1)C[C@@H]2CC3)C)CC[C@@]45C
- InChI: InChI=1S/C21H31NO2/c1-19-11-13-12-24-22-18(13)10-14(19)4-5-15-16(19)6-8-20(2)17(15)7-9-21(20,3)23/h12,14-17,23H,4-11H2,1-3H3/t14-,15+,16-,17-,19-,20-,21-/m0/s1; Key:NSYTUNFHWYMMHU-IYRCEVNGSA-N

Androisoxazole (brand names Androxan, Neo-Ponden, Neo-Pondus), also known as 17α-methyl-5α-androstano[3,2-c]isoxazol-17β-ol, is an orally active anabolic-androgenic steroid (AAS) and a 17α-alkylated derivative of dihydrotestosterone (DHT) that is marketed in Spain and Italy. It is closely related to stanozolol, differing only in having an isoxazole instead of pyrazole ring fused to the A ring, and is also related to furazabol, prostanozol, and danazol.
