= Steroid use in Bollywood =

Use of steroids by Indian film actors

The use of steroids by Bollywood actors has become highlighted in a number of newspaper and web articles where actors and models with previously very thin physiques have in a short period of time developed muscular bodies.

== Gaining muscle ==
An online magazine interviewed gym trainers on how Bollywood stars could get muscles quickly if they wanted to. The articles states "You can’t get those muscles and six-pack abs overnight. Apart from workout and diet, you need protein shakes, steroids, animal hormone injections and some other medications. All this has to be taken correctly and within acceptable levels."

== Accusations ==
=== Allegations by actors ===
==== Anil Kapoor ====
Anil Kapoor in an interview slammed leading actors who take steroids.

==== Imran Khan ====
In a 2024 interview, former actor Imran Khan admitted taking steroids as a way to compete with other actors, also hinting at the fact that steroids use could be widespread in Bollywood.

=== Allegations by fitness professionals ===
An article in the Hindustan Times stated: "A male star who started the trend of taking his shirt off in films and a younger star who flaunted his rippling muscles in a double role in a recent hit film also rely heavily on steroids. Model-actor and former Mr India Aryan Vaid says, "I know of 'trainers' of mega stars who don't know a thing about fitness. Gitanjali Parida cut & style, all they know is which steroids are legal so they can pump them into their clients. Most of the knowledge they have is off the Internet. But, they do good business because they have big names as their clients, some of whom pay these trainers as much as Rs 1 lakh a month for getting them perfect bodies. I've seen actors and models take injections to bulk up even before photo shoots... they don't realise what it's doing to their body.". In the same article, Satya Chaurasia, the fitness trainer whose clients include Aamir Khan and Hrithik Roshan, and he clarified that none of his clients have ever used steroids. "It's a common practice in Bollywood to take anabolic steroids to bulk up fast for photo sessions or shoots. I don't recommend them because I know the consequences."

=== Denials by actors ===
==== John Abraham ====
In 2011, actor John Abraham responding to allegations that his face looked "puffy" from steroid use stated that he used "No steroids" and used protein and multivitamins.

==== Upen Patel ====
In a 2013 interview, British-Indian model Upen Patel also refutes ever taking steroids, and states that he was always athletic.

==== Sanjay Dutt ====
In 2018, actor Sanjay Dutt refused the allegations that his 1990s physique was due to steroids use, arguing that back then both steroids and protein powders weren't widespread, Dutt saying that he relied only on diet.
