= JNJ-5207852 =

Names
- Preferred IUPAC name 1-(3-{4-[(piperidin-1-yl)methyl]phenoxy}propyl)piperidine

Identifiers
CAS Number	398473-34-2
3D model (JSmol)	Interactive image
Abbreviations	JNJ-5207852
ChEMBL	ChEMBL129542
ChemSpider	2046959
IUPHAR/BPS	1256
MeSH	JNJ-5207852
PubChem CID	2766326
UNII	4I9OVB1G7D
CompTox Dashboard (EPA)	DTXSID70377579
- InChI: InChI=1S/C20H32N2O/c1-3-12-21(13-4-1)16-7-17-23-20-10-8-19(9-11-20)18-22-14-5-2-6-15-22/h8-11H,1-7,12-18H2 Key: PTKHFRNHJULJKT-UHFFFAOYSA-N
- SMILES: O(c1ccc(cc1)CN2CCCCC2)CCCN3CCCCC3

Properties
Chemical formula	C_{20}H_{32}N_{2}O
Molar mass	316.480 g/mol
- Except where otherwise noted, data are given for materials in their standard state (at 25 °C [77 °F], 100 kPa). verify (what is ?) Infobox references

JNJ-5207852 is a histamine antagonist selective for the H_{3} subtype. It has stimulant and nootropic effects in animal studies, and has been suggested as a possible treatment for some memory defects associated with epilepsy. JNJ-5207852 itself did not progress to clinical development due to poor pharmacokinetic characteristics, but the related compound JNJ-17216498 was in a Phase II clinical trial for the treatment of narcolepsy in 2007.
