= Mesabolone =

Chemical compound

Clinical data
- Other names: 1-Testosterone 17β-methoxycyclopentyl ether
- Drug class: Androgen; Anabolic steroid; Androgen ether

Identifiers
- IUPAC name: (5S,8R,9S,10R,13R,14R,17S)-17-(1-methoxycyclohexyl)oxy-10,13-dimethyl-4,5,6,7,8,9,11,12,14,15,16,17-dodecahydrocyclopenta[a]phenanthren-3-one
- CAS Number: 7483-09-2
- PubChem CID: 252294
- DrugBank: DB19928
- ChemSpider: 221051
- UNII: 4AH506J7QM
- CompTox Dashboard (EPA): DTXSID70225804

Chemical and physical data
- Formula: C_{26}H_{40}O_{3}
- Molar mass: 400.603 g·mol^{−1}
- 3D model (JSmol): Interactive image; Interactive image
- SMILES: C[C@@]12CC[C@H]3[C@H]([C@H]1CC[C@@H]2OC4(CCCCC4)OC)CC[C@@H]5[C@@]3(C=CC(=O)C5)C; O=C1\C=C/[C@@]5(C)[C@H](C1)CC[C@@H]4[C@@H]5CC[C@@]3(C)[C@H]4CC[C@@H]3OC2(OC)CCCCC2
- InChI: InChI=1S/C26H40O3/c1-24-15-11-19(27)17-18(24)7-8-20-21-9-10-23(25(21,2)16-12-22(20)24)29-26(28-3)13-5-4-6-14-26/h11,15,18,20-23H,4-10,12-14,16-17H2,1-3H3/t18-,20-,21-,22-,23-,24-,25-/m0/s1; Key:AGGYYWICUTUTCC-NMTVEPIMSA-N

Mesabolone, also known as 1-testosterone 17β-methoxycyclopentyl ether, is a synthetic anabolic–androgenic steroid (AAS) that was never marketed. It is the 17β-(1-methoxycyclohexane) ether of 1-testosterone (dihydroboldenone).

== Chemistry ==
=== Synthesis ===
Syntheses of mesabolone have been published.
