= Methyldiazinol =

Anabolic steroid

Clinical data
- Other names: Methyldiazirinol; 3,3-Azo-17α-methyl-5α-dihydrotestosterone; 3,3-Azo-17α-methyl-DHT; 3,3-Azo-17α-methyl-5α-androstan-17β-ol; 3-Azi-17α-methyl-5α-androstan-17β-ol
- Routes of administration: By mouth
- Drug class: Androgen; Anabolic steroid

Identifiers
- IUPAC name: (5S,8R,9S,10S,13S,14S,17S)-10,13,17-Trimethylspiro[2,4,5,6,7,8,9,11,12,14,15,16-dodecahydro-1H-cyclopenta[a]phenanthrene-3,3'-diazirine]-17-ol
- CAS Number: 2429-17-6
- PubChem CID: 112500385
- ChemSpider: 52084890
- UNII: 7AA03AP597
- CompTox Dashboard (EPA): DTXSID201189902

Chemical and physical data
- Formula: C_{20}H_{32}N_{2}O
- Molar mass: 316.489 g·mol^{−1}
- 3D model (JSmol): Interactive image
- SMILES: C[C@]12CCC3(C[C@@H]1CC[C@@H]4[C@@H]2CC[C@]5([C@H]4CC[C@]5(C)O)C)N=N3
- InChI: InChI=LMNFACKYKJIJHJ-PHFHYRSDSA-N; Key:1S/C20H32N2O/c1-17-10-11-20(21-22-20)12-13(17)4-5-14-15(17)6-8-18(2)16(14)7-9-19(18,3)23/h13-16,23H,4-12H2,1-3H3/t13-,14+,15-,16-,17-,18-,19-/m0/s1

Methyldiazinol (also known as 3,3-azo-17α-methyl-5α-dihydrotestosterone, 3-azi-17α-methyl-DHT, or 3,3-azo-17α-methyl-5α-androstan-17β-ol) is a synthetic and orally active androgen/anabolic steroid (AAS) which was never marketed. It is a 17α-methylated derivative of dihydrotestosterone (DHT); specifically, it is the C3 azi (i.e., 3,3-azo) analogue of mestanolone (17α-methyl-DHT). The drug has been found to possess a high ratio and dissociation of myotrophic to androgenic activity; relative to methyltestosterone, its ratio was 15 (3:0.2), among the highest observed.

== See also ==
- List of androgens/anabolic steroids
