= Prostanozol =

Chemical compound

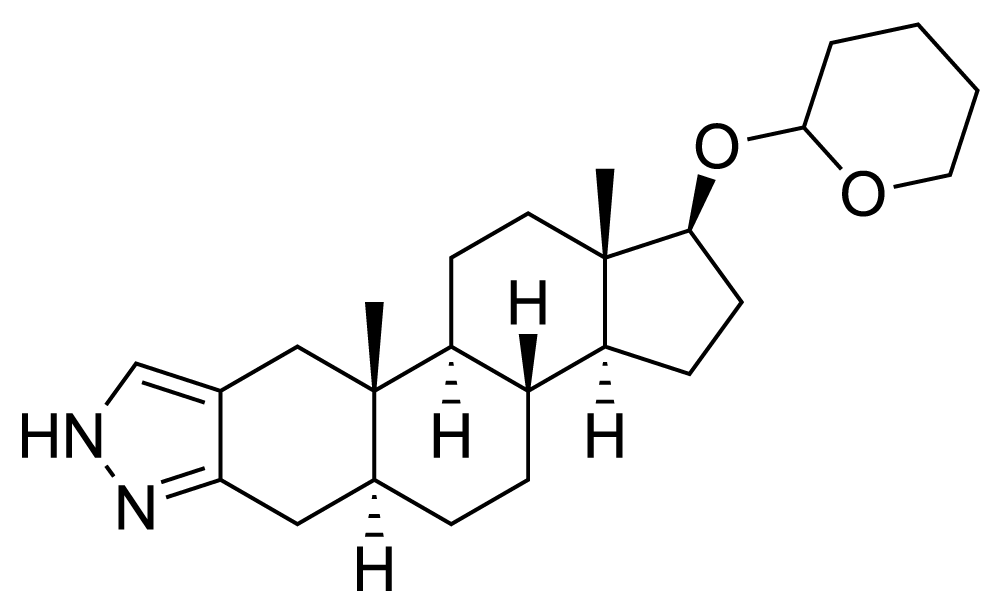

Clinical data
- Other names: 17α-Demethylstanozolol 17β-tetrahydropyran ether; 17β-[(Tetrahydro-2H-pyran-2-yl)oxy]-5α-androst-2-eno[3,2-c]pyrazole; [3,2-c]Pyrazole-5α-etioallocholane-17β-tetrahydropyranol; 17β-[(Tetrahydro-2H-pyran-2-yl)oxy]-2'H-5α-androst-2-eno[3,2-c]pyrazole; Pyrazolo[4',3':2,3]-5α-androstan-17β-ol 17β-tetrahydropyran ether
- Routes of administration: By mouth
- Drug class: Androgen; Anabolic steroid; Androgen ether

Identifiers
- IUPAC name: (1S,3aS,3bR,5aS,10aS,10bS,12aS)-10a,12a-dimethyl-1-((tetrahydro-2H-pyran-2-yl)oxy)-1,2,3,3a,3b,4,5,5a,6,7,10,10a,10b,11,12,12a-hexadecahydrocyclopenta[5,6]naphtho[1,2-f]indazole
- CAS Number: 1186001-41-1
- PubChem CID: 56842253
- ChemSpider: 32700007
- UNII: JNU1579M5D
- CompTox Dashboard (EPA): DTXSID40152178

Chemical and physical data
- Formula: C_{25}H_{38}N_{2}O_{2}
- Molar mass: 398.591 g·mol^{−1}
- 3D model (JSmol): Interactive image
- SMILES: C[C@]12CC[C@H]3[C@H]([C@@H]1CC[C@@H]2OC4CCCCO4)CC[C@@H]5[C@@]3(CC6=C(C5)NN=C6)C

Prostanozol, also known as demethylstanozolol tetrahydropyran ether, is an androgen/anabolic steroid (AAS) and designer steroid which acts as a prodrug of the 17α-demethylated analogue of stanozolol (Winstrol). It was found in 2005 as an ingredient of products sold as "dietary supplements" for bodybuilding.

It is one of hundreds of drugs banned from the Olympics by the IOC. Russian marathon runner Lyubov Denisova was banned for two years from competition after testing positive for prostanozol and testosterone in 2007.
