= CNS Drugs (journal) =

- Discipline: Drug therapy, pharmacology
- Language: English
- Edited by: Sue Pochon

Publication details
- History: 1994-present
- Publisher: Adis International (Springer Nature) (New Zealand)
- Frequency: Monthly
- Open access: Hybrid
- Impact factor: 7.4 (2024)

Standard abbreviations
- ISO 4: CNS Drugs

Indexing
- ISSN: 1172-7047 (print); 1179-1934 (web)
- OCLC no.: 477236411

Links
- Journal homepage; Online archive

CNS Drugs is a monthly peer-reviewed medical journal published by Adis International (Springer Nature) that covers drug treatment of psychiatric and neurological disorders.

== Abstracting and indexing ==
The journal is abstracted and indexed in:

- MEDLINE
- EMBASE
- International Pharmaceutical Abstracts
- BIOSIS Previews
- Current Contents/Clinical Medicine
- Current Contents/Life Sciences
- Science Citation Index
- Neuroscience Citation Index
- PASCAL
- Chemical Abstracts Service
- PsycINFO

According to the Journal Citation Reports, the journal has a 2024 impact factor of 7.4.
