= 3-Hydroxysteroid dehydrogenase =

3-Hydroxysteroid dehydrogenase (3-HSD) may refer to:

- 3α-Hydroxysteroid dehydrogenase (3α-HSD)
- 3β-Hydroxysteroid dehydrogenase (3β-HSD)
