= Methyl-1-testosterone =

Chemical compound

Clinical data
- Other names: M1T; SC-11195; Methyldihydroboldenone; 17α-Methyl-1-testosterone; 17α-Methyl-4,5α-dihydro-δ^{1}-testosterone; 17α-Methyl-δ^{1}-DHT; 17α-Methyl-5α-androst-1-en-17β-ol-3-one
- Routes of administration: By mouth

Identifiers
- IUPAC name: (5S,8R,9S,10R,13S,14S,17S)-17-hydroxy-10,13,17-trimethyl-5,6,7,8,9,11,12,14,15,16-decahydro-4H-cyclopenta[a]phenanthren-3-one
- CAS Number: 65-04-3
- PubChem CID: 7092657
- DrugBank: DB01572
- ChemSpider: 5442174
- UNII: 21O907N0NH
- CompTox Dashboard (EPA): DTXSID20879831
- ECHA InfoCard: 100.219.594

Chemical and physical data
- Formula: C_{20}H_{30}O_{2}
- Molar mass: 302.458 g·mol^{−1}
- 3D model (JSmol): Interactive image
- SMILES: O=C4\C=C/[C@]1([C@@H](CC[C@@H]2[C@@H]1CC[C@]3([C@H]2CC[C@@]3(O)C)C)C4)C
- InChI: InChI=1S/C20H30O2/c1-18-9-6-14(21)12-13(18)4-5-15-16(18)7-10-19(2)17(15)8-11-20(19,3)22/h6,9,13,15-17,22H,4-5,7-8,10-12H2,1-3H3/t13-,15+,16-,17-,18-,19-,20-/m0/s1; Key:JRNSSSJKIGAFCT-YDSAWKJFSA-N

Methyl-1-testosterone (M1T; developmental code name SC-11195), also known as 17α-methyl-4,5α-dihydro-δ^{1}-testosterone (17α-methyl-δ^{1}-DHT) or 17α-methyl-5α-androst-1-en-17β-ol-3-one, as well as methyldihydroboldenone, is a synthetic and orally active anabolic–androgenic steroid (AAS) which was never marketed for medical use. It is the 17α-methyl derivative of 1-testosterone (Δ^{1}-DHT; dihydroboldenone).

Methyl-1-testosterone is on the World Anti-Doping Agency's list of prohibited substances, and is therefore banned from use in most major sports.

== Applications ==
- M1T is used to make oxandrolone.
- Michael addition of a methyl group would be expected to give Demalon [2881-21-2].
