= Isocaproic acid =

Names
- Preferred IUPAC name 4-Methylpentanoic acid
- Other names 4-Methylvaleric acid 4,4-Dimethylbutanoic acid Isobutylacetic acid Isohexanoic acid Isohexoic acid

Identifiers
CAS Number	646-07-1
3D model (JSmol)	Interactive image
ChEBI	CHEBI:74903
ChemSpider	12067
ECHA InfoCard	100.010.423
PubChem CID	12587
UNII	4G4U8JA28T
CompTox Dashboard (EPA)	DTXSID8060951
- InChI: InChI=1S/C6H12O2/c1-5(2)3-4-6(7)8/h5H,3-4H2,1-2H3,(H,7,8) Key: FGKJLKRYENPLQH-UHFFFAOYSA-N; InChI=1/C6H12O2/c1-5(2)3-4-6(7)8/h5H,3-4H2,1-2H3,(H,7,8) Key: FGKJLKRYENPLQH-UHFFFAOYAB
- SMILES: CC(C)CCC(=O)O

Properties
Chemical formula	C_{6}H_{12}O_{2}
Molar mass	116.160 g·mol^{−1}
- Except where otherwise noted, data are given for materials in their standard state (at 25 °C [77 °F], 100 kPa). Infobox references

Isocaproic acid, also known as 4-methylpentanoic acid or 4-methylvaleric acid, is a carboxylic acid of five carbons with methyl substitution at the fourth carbon. Isocaproic acid, which is used in perfumes, causes irritation of rabbit skin and eyes, and ketogenesis, yet is considered generally safe.

It also has been "evaluated" as an insecticide.
