= Structure–activity relationships of anabolic steroids =

Testosterone.

Steroid ring system.

The structure–activity relationships (SAR) of anabolic steroids (AAS) have been extensively studied.

== List of modifications ==
- Addition of a methyl or ethyl group at the C17α position confers dramatically improved metabolic stability during first-pass metabolism, allowing for oral administration. However, it also confers hepatotoxicity. Examples: methyltestosterone, metandienone, norethandrolone, mestanolone.
- Addition of a methyl or ethyl group at the C17α position can confer increased estrogenicity due to the aromatized metabolite having much greater metabolic stability. Examples: methyltestosterone, norethandrolone.
- Addition of a methyl or ethyl group at the C17α position to 19-nortestosterone derivatives can greatly increase progestogenic activity. Examples: normethandrone.
- An extended or bulkier group at the C17α position reduces AR agonist activity or changes the steroid into an antiandrogen. An ethynyl group (e.g., ethisterone, norethisterone), allyl group (e.g., allylestrenol), or vinyl group (e.g., norvinisterone) all dramatically reduce AR agonist activity. A propyl group (e.g., topterone, rosterolone) or cyanomethyl group (e.g., dienogest) produces AR antagonist activity.
- Addition of substituents at the C16 position can convert the steroid into an antiandrogen. Examples: oxendolone, metogest.
- Attachment of esters at the C3 and/or C17β hydroxyl groups confers increased lipophilicity and hence depot activity when administered in oil via intramuscular injection. Examples: testosterone enanthate, nandrolone decanoate, drostanolone propionate, boldenone undecylenate.
- Attachment of a very long-chain ester such as undecanoate at the C17β position can confer some oral activity via absorption by the lymphatic system. Examples: testosterone undecanoate.
- Removal of a double bond between the C4 and C5 positions in testosterone, otherwise known as 5α-reduction, confers several-fold increased AR agonist activity to testosterone. The same is not true in the case of 19-nortestosterone derivatives, in which the opposite is the case. Examples: increased: testosterone to dihydrotestosterone; decreased: nandrolone to 5α-dihydronandrolone.
- Removal of the C19 methyl group from testosterone (but not from dihydrotestosterone) confers increased anabolic activity but decreased androgenic activity, resulting in a much greater ratio of anabolic to androgenic effect. The decreased androgenic activity is thought to be related to the 5α-reduced metabolite of testosterone, dihydrotestosterone, having greater AR potency than testosterone, but the 5α-reduced metabolites of 19-nortestosterone derivatives having diminished AR agonist potency relative to their parent steroids. Removal of the C19 methyl group can also decrease aromatization and estrogenicity as well as confer progestogenic activity. Examples: nandrolone, trenbolone, normethandrone, norethandrolone, ethylestrenol.
- Introduction of a double bond between the C1 and C2 positions can confer increased metabolic stability against enzymes such as 5α-reductase and aromatase. This can result in a greater ratio of anabolic to androgenic effect and reduced estrogenicity. Examples: metandienone, boldenone undecylenate, chlorodehydromethyltestosterone.
- Introduction of a substituent such as a hydroxyl group or chlorine atom at the C4 position can reduce or prevent 5α-reduction and aromatization, resulting in a greater ratio of anabolic to androgenic effect and reduced estrogenicity. Examples: clostebol, enestebol, chlorodehydromethyltestosterone, oxabolone.
- Introduction of double bonds between the C9 and C10 positions and between the C11 and C12 positions can confer greatly increased potency. Examples: trenbolone, metribolone, dimethyltrienolone, tetrahydrogestrinone.
- Introduction of a methyl group at the C7α position can increase potency and prevent 5α-reduction. Examples: bolasterone, trestolone, mibolerone, dimethyltrienolone, tibolone.
- Introduction of a methyl group at the C1 or C1α position can confer some oral activity. Examples: metenolone acetate, mesterolone.
- Replacement of the C2 carbon atom with an oxygen atom in 17α-alkylated AAS can improve metabolic stability and decrease hepatotoxicity. Examples: oxandrolone.
- Substitutions at the C2 or C2α position such as methyl, hydroxymethylene, or a fused ring can improve metabolic stability. Examples: drostanolone, oxymetholone, stanozolol, danazol.
- A hydroxyl group (instead of a ketone) at the C3 position and/or a ketone (instead of a hydroxyl group) at the C17β can dramatically decrease AR agonist activity but render the steroid into an androgen prohormone. Examples: dehydroepiandrosterone, androstenedione, androstenediol, bolandiol, bolandione.
- Removal of the ketone at the C3 position can dramatically decrease AR agonist activity but render the steroid into an androgen prohormone. Examples: ethylestrenol, bolenol, desoxymethyltestosterone.
- Aromatization of the A ring abolishes AR affinity and produces estrogenicity. Examples: estradiol, 17α-methylestradiol, 17α-ethylestradiol, 7α-methylestradiol.
