= Estrone methyl ether =

Chemical compound

Clinical data
- Other names: Oestrone methyl ether; Estrone 3-methyl ether; 3-Methoxyestrone; 3-Methoxyestra-1,3,5(10)-trien-17-one
- Drug class: Estrogen; Estrogen ether

Identifiers
- IUPAC name: (8R,9S,13S,14S)-3-methoxy-13-methyl-7,8,9,11,12,14,15,16-octahydro-6H-cyclopenta[a]phenanthren-17-one
- CAS Number: 1624-62-0 1091-94-7
- PubChem CID: 92895
- ChemSpider: 83859
- UNII: 4SMZ4A51IJ
- ChEMBL: ChEMBL1409077
- CompTox Dashboard (EPA): DTXSID40167368
- ECHA InfoCard: 100.015.104

Chemical and physical data
- Formula: C_{19}H_{24}O_{2}
- Molar mass: 284.399 g·mol^{−1}
- 3D model (JSmol): Interactive image
- SMILES: C[C@]12CC[C@H]3[C@H]([C@@H]1CCC2=O)CCC4=C3C=CC(=C4)OC
- InChI: InChI=1S/C19H24O2/c1-19-10-9-15-14-6-4-13(21-2)11-12(14)3-5-16(15)17(19)7-8-18(19)20/h4,6,11,15-17H,3,5,7-10H2,1-2H3/t15-,16-,17+,19+/m1/s1; Key:BCWWDWHFBMPLFQ-VXNCWWDNSA-N

Estrone methyl ether, or estrone 3-methyl ether, is a synthetic estrogen and estrogen ether – specifically, the C3 methyl ether of estrone – which was never marketed.

== Chemistry ==
=== Synthesis ===
Despite recent advances in the total synthesis, the majority of estrogen is manufactured semi-synthetically e.g. from boldione precursor.

A couple of enantioselective routes were disclosed by E.J. Corey et al:

1. Dane's diene route:
2. & 1-vinyl-6-methoxy-1-tetralol [3125-36-8] route:

The starting material in the above schematic was named Dane’s diene [2811-50-9] (1) after Elisabeth Dane. The first step is a Diels-Alder reaction with 2-Methyl-2-cyclopenten-1-one [1120-73-6] (2) to give PC12811167 (3). The next step yields PC11119485 (4). Conjugation of the enone olefin double bond with the other olefin for the next step resulted in the "Torgov diene" (PC1259524) (5). Reduction of the olefin bonds completes the synthesis of the target molecule (6). An 88% yield was reported for the last step. The preparation of the catalyst is shown underneath. A very similar catalyst to this was seen in the preparation of a compound called sezolamide.

The racemic version was also reported:

The Torgov cyclization has some fundamental differences from Dane's route but both methods give the intermediate Torgov diene [966-47-2]. It is named after a USSR chemist called Igor Torgov.

The starting material is called 6-methoxy-1-tetralone [1078-19-9] Some older methods are included for historical context. This compound finds dual use in the synthesis of the SERM compounds Lasofoxifene & Nafoxidine. It can be rearranged to 6-methoxy-2-tetralone [2472-22-2], one known application is in the synthesis of tolnapersine.

Smith & Hughes work is also worthy of consideration {This has been covered on the norgestrel and norboletone pages}. In Lednicer's book on steroids reference is made to 6-oxaestrogens. Although no references were provided in the book the following citations could be found online: In this process the catalytic hydrogenation step of the two olefins adds the hydrogens to the alpha face of the steroid. This is not the same as natural configuration. Lednicer claims that if the catalytic hydrogenation is performed in acetic acid then the 8-iso hydrogen equilibrates so as to yield the favored trans 8–9 ring juncture.

Other learning materials:

== Applications ==
Estrone methyl ether has use in the synthesis of the following steroids:

1. Mestranol (ethinylestradiol 3-methyl ether). Mestranol in-turn is the precursor chemical to Norgesterone.
2. Dienogest.
3. Norethandrolone For the purposes of comparison, see the related compound Ethylmetrienone [848-04-4], which is totally synthetic but finds use in the synthesis of Norboletone. N.B. although Birch reduction of Estrone methyl ether was the original method of synthesizing Norethandrolone, it is interesting to learn that a newer method than this was patented recently. This newer improved method of synthesis relied of a precursor that is called Bolandione.
4. The reduction of the ketone in estrone methyl ether gives estradiol methyl ether. This in-turn, was used in the synthesis of Noretynodrel. Another use is in the synthesis of 11-Keto-3-methoxy-estra-1,3,5(10),8-tetraen-17beta-ol [17401-32-0]. This compound in-turn is of interest because it is the starting material used in the synthesis of 8β-VE2.
5. The Birch reduction of Estrone methyl ether gives Nandrolone since the 17-keto group is reduced concomitantly during this step. Back-oxidation occurs to give Bolandione; this in-turn can be used to make Norethisterone & Allylestrenol.
6. With a suitable demethylating agent can be used to make estrone.
7. Clomestrone
8. Prenortestosterone [1089-78-7] (see under nandrolone synthesis) can be brominated. 2x dehydrohalogenation step then leads to dienolone.
9. Epimestrol
10. Ethylestrenol
11. The Nandrolone also finds use in the synthesis of mibolerone, LS-1727, Cingestol, Lynoestrenol, Estradiol-3-amine [10427-24-4] & as the starting material that fulvestrant is made from. & tibolone & trestolone.
12. Estr-5(10)-ene-3,17-dione [3962-66-1] can be used to make Plomestane, or halogenation, double dehydrohalogenation can lead to dienedione.
13. Estrone methyl ether was employed in the 11β-Methyl-19-nortestosterone patent, e.g. for 11β-Fluoro-4-estren-17-ol-3-one (PC23396842). This in-turn can be aromatized to 11beta-fluoro-estradiol. {Although it is facile to get from Estrone methyl ether to 11beta-fluoro-estradiol w/o passing through 11β-Fluoro-4-estren-17-ol-3-one.}

== See also ==
- List of estrogen esters § Ethers of steroidal estrogens
