= C19H24O2 =

The molecular formula C_{19}H_{24}O_{2} may refer to:

- Almestrone, a synthetic, steroidal estrogen
- Boldione, an anabolic steroid
- Estrone methyl ether, an estrogen
- Metribolone, an anabolic steroid
