= Dimethylnortestosterone =

Dimethylnortestosterone may refer to:

- Dimethandrolone (7α,11β-dimethyl-19-nortestosterone)
- Dimethyltrienolone (7α,17α-dimethyl-19-nor-δ^{9,11}-testosterone)
- Mibolerone (7α,17α-dimethyl-19-nortestosterone)

== See also ==
- Methylnortestosterone
