= Dimethandrolone undecanoate =

Chemical compound

Clinical data
- Other names: Dimethandrolone undecylate; DMAU; CDB-4521; Dimethylnandrolone undecanoate; 7α,11β-Dimethyl-19-nortestosterone 17β-undecanoate; 7α,11β-Dimethylestr-4-en-17β-ol-3-one 17β-undecanoate
- Routes of administration: By mouth, intramuscular injection
- Drug class: Androgen; Anabolic steroid; Androgen ester; Progestogen

Identifiers
- IUPAC name: (1S,2R,9R,10R,11S,14S,15S,17S)-9,15,17-Trimethyl-5-oxotetracyclo[8.7.0.0^{2,7}.0^{11,15}]heptadec-6-en-14-yl undecanoate
- CAS Number: 366472-45-9
- PubChem CID: 67333747
- DrugBank: DB16141
- ChemSpider: 68025242
- UNII: VMT7Z23GLM

Chemical and physical data
- Formula: C_{31}H_{50}O_{3}
- Molar mass: 470.738 g·mol^{−1}
- 3D model (JSmol): Interactive image
- SMILES: O(C(CCCCCCCCCC)=O)[C@]1CC[C@]([H])2[C@@]([H])3[C@](C)CC4=CC(CC[C@]4([H])[C@@]3([H])[C@@](C)C[C@@]21C)=O
- InChI: InChI=1S/C31H47O3/c1-5-6-7-8-9-10-11-12-13-28(33)34-27-17-16-26-30-21(2)18-23-19-24(32)14-15-25(23)29(30)22(3)20-31(26,27)4/h19,25-26,29-30H,5-18,20H2,1-4H3/t25-,26-,29+,30-,31-/m0/s1; Key:UITXCSFWQRCENT-SJDWCGKGSA-N

Dimethandrolone undecanoate (DMAU), also known by its developmental code name CDB-4521, is an experimental androgen/anabolic steroid (AAS) and progestogen medication which is under development as a potential birth control pill for men. It is taken by mouth, but can also be given by injection into muscle.

Side effects of DMAU include mild weight gain and mild decreases in levels of HDL cholesterol. It may also cause low estrogen levels and associated symptoms such as reduced sexual function and decreased bone mineral density. DMAU is an AAS, and hence is an agonist of the androgen receptor, the biological target of androgens like testosterone. It is also a progestin, or a synthetic progestogen, and hence is an agonist of the progesterone receptor, the biological target of progestogens like progesterone. Due to its androgenic and progestogenic activity, DMAU has antigonadotropic effects. These effects result in reversible suppression of sperm production and are responsible for the contraceptive effects of DMAU in men. The medication has no estrogenic activity. DMAU is a prodrug of dimethandrolone.

DMAU was first described in 2002. It was developed by the Contraceptive Development Branch of the National Institute of Child Health and Human Development, an agency in the United States government.

== Medical uses ==
DMAU is an experimental medication and is not currently approved for medical use. It is under development for use as a potential male hormonal contraceptive, specifically as a birth control pill for men. The medication has been found to profoundly and rapidly reversibly suppress testicular testosterone production in men when taken by mouth once per day for a month. The circulating levels of testosterone achieved with oral DMAU were equivalent to those seen on average with surgical castration (13.4 ng/dL for DMAU, 15 ng/dL for castration). Following discontinuation of DMAU, testosterone levels began to recover within days and reached normal levels within a month. Testicular testosterone production is essential for spermatogenesis and fertility in men. Suppression of spermatogenesis and the actual contraceptive effects of DMAU in men have not yet been clinically assessed, but future studies are being planned to confirm the contraceptive effectiveness of the medication. In addition to male contraception, there has also been interest in the potential use of DMAU in androgen replacement therapy for low testosterone levels in men.

== Side effects ==
In a clinical study, DMAU was found to be well tolerated when administered to men for a month. Side effects included mild weight gain (between 3 and 9 pounds) and mild decreases in levels of HDL cholesterol. No major or serious side effects were observed.

Because DMAU is not 5α-reduced, in contrast to testosterone, it may have less risk of scalp hair loss.

=== Low estrogen levels ===
Because DMAU suppresses testosterone levels and by extension estrogen levels in men but has no estrogenic activity of its own, it may pose a risk of symptoms of low estrogen levels such as sexual dysfunction (e.g., decreased sex drive, reduced erectile function) and osteoporosis. Reduced sexual function and decreased bone mineral density have been observed with the closely related medication trestolone, which has low estrogenicity similarly to DMAU.

=== Liver toxicity ===
Unlike testosterone but similarly to 17α-alkyated AAS like methyltestosterone (17α-methyltestosterone), DMAU has been found to produce some effects indicative of potential liver toxicity when it was administered orally to animals. However, the effects were significantly less than those of methyltestosterone. Both DMAU and trestolone (7α-methyl-19-nortestosterone) showed potential signs of liver toxicity whereas 11β-methyl-19-nortestosterone 17β-dodecylcarbonate showed few to no such effects, suggesting that the C7α methyl group of DMAU and trestolone could be an important contributing factor to their liver toxicity potential. In any case, however, in a clinical study, DMAU was found to be safe in terms of liver and kidney function when administered to men for a month.

== Pharmacology ==
=== Pharmacodynamics ===
DMAU is an androgen ester, specifically an ester of dimethandrolone, and acts as a prodrug of dimethandrolone in the body. As such, it is an AAS, or an agonist of the androgen receptor, and is also a progestogen, or an agonist of the progesterone receptor. Due to these activities, DMAU has potent antigonadotropic effects, and is able to powerfully suppress testosterone levels. This results in suppression of spermatogenesis and is responsible for its hormonal contraceptive effects in men. The medication is not aromatized and has no estrogenic activity. In addition, it is not a substrate for 5α-reductase and hence is not potentiated or inactivated in tissues that express 5α-reductase like skin, hair follicles, and the prostate gland. As such, DMAU may have a reduced risk of androgenic side effects and androgen-dependent conditions such as acne, pattern scalp hair loss, body hair growth, benign prostatic hyperplasia, and prostate cancer relative to testosterone and certain other AAS.

=== Pharmacokinetics ===
A pharmacokinetic study of DMAU in men found that only 2 to 3% of the drug was hydrolyzed into dimethandrolone when it was administered orally in the form of powder in capsules. In contrast, hydrolysis of testosterone undecanoate into testosterone is rapid and appears to be complete. The difference in conversion efficiency with DMAU relative to testosterone undecanoate is attributed to steric hindrance in DMAU caused by its additional C7α and C11β methyl groups. Although the hydrolysis of DMAU into dimethandrolone was very limited, it was still sufficient to produce dose-dependent biological effects at the dosages assessed, including reversible suppression of luteinizing hormone and testosterone levels. A subsequent pharmacokinetic study found that the conversion of DMAU into dimethandrolone was improved when the drug was delivered orally in castor oil/benzyl benzoate or a self-emulsifying drug delivery system contained in capsules as opposed to powder in capsules.

== Chemistry ==
Dimethandrolone undecanoate, also known as 7α,11β-dimethyl-19-nortestosterone 17β-undecanoate or as 7α,11β-dimethylestr-4-en-17β-ol-3-one 17β-undecanoate, is a synthetic estrane steroid and a non-17α-alkylated derivative of 19-nortestosterone. It is the C17β undecanoate (undecylate) ester of dimethandrolone (7α,11β-dimethyl-19-nortestosterone). Other esters of dimethandrolone, such as dimethandrolone buciclate (CDB-4386A) and dimethandrolone dodecylcarbonate (CDB-4730), have also been developed. Analogous esters of closely related AAS include trestolone acetate (7α-methyl-19-nortestosterone 17β-acetate) and 11β-methyl-19-nortestosterone 17β-dodecylcarbonate.

== History ==
A patent for dimethandrolone was filed in 1997 and was granted in 1999. Subsequently, a patent for DMAU and dimethandrolone buciclate was filed in 2002 and was granted to the United States government in 2003. DMAU was developed under the code name CDB-4521 by the Contraceptive Development Branch of the National Institute of Child Health and Human Development, one of the National Institutes of Health in the United States Department of Health and Human Services. The first clinical studies of DMAU in men were published in 2014 (single-dose), 2015 (single-dose), and 2018 (continuous for one month).
