= Methylnortestosterone =

Methylnortestosterone may refer to:

- 11β-Methyl-19-nortestosterone (11β-MNT)
- Methyldienolone (17α-methyl-19-nor-δ^{9}-testosterone)
- Metribolone (methyltrienolone; R-1881; 17α-methyl-19-nor-δ^{9,11}-testosterone)
- Normethandrone (methylestrenolone; normethisterone; 17α-methyl-19-nortestosterone)
- Trestolone (7α-methyl-19-nortestosterone; MENT)

== See also ==
- Dimethylnortestosterone
