= Dimethyldienolone =

Chemical compound

Clinical data
- Other names: RU-2788; 7α,17α-Dimethyldienolone; Δ^{9}-Mibolerone; δ^{9}-7α,17α-Dimethyl-19-nortestosterone; 7α,17α-Dimethylestr-4,9-dien-17β-ol-3-one
- Drug class: Androgen; Anabolic steroid

Identifiers
- CAS Number: 15506-10-2
- PubChem CID: 101678227
- ChemSpider: 129562347
- UNII: Q8KTT5PHQ5

Chemical and physical data
- Formula: C_{20}H_{28}O_{2}
- Molar mass: 300.442 g·mol^{−1}
- 3D model (JSmol): Interactive image
- SMILES: C[C@@H]1CC2=CC(=O)CCC2=C3[C@@H]1[C@@H]4CC[C@]([C@]4(CC3)C)(C)O
- InChI: InChI=1S/C20H28O2/c1-12-10-13-11-14(21)4-5-15(13)16-6-8-19(2)17(18(12)16)7-9-20(19,3)22/h11-12,17-18,22H,4-10H2,1-3H3/t12-,17+,18-,19+,20+/m1/s1; Key:NDTOIEPBCIVPTI-ZGPIAVDESA-N

Dimethyldienolone (developmental code name RU-2788), or 7α,17α-dimethyldienolone, also known as δ^{9}-7α,17α-dimethyl-19-nortestosterone or as 7α,17α-dimethylestr-4,9-dien-17β-ol-3-one, is a 17α-alkylated androgen/anabolic steroid of the 19-nortestosterone group which was never marketed. It is closely related to dimethyltrienolone, as well as to mibolerone and metribolone. Dimethyldienolone shows high affinity for the androgen and progesterone receptors.

Dimethyldienolone is made from almestrone.

== See also ==
- List of androgens/anabolic steroids
