= 7α-Methyl-19-norandrostenedione =

Chemical compound

Clinical data
- Other names: 7α-Methyl-19-norandrost-4-ene-3,17-dione; 7α-Methylestr-4-ene-3,17-dione; MENT dione; Trestione; Mentabolan
- Routes of administration: Oral

Identifiers
- IUPAC name: (7R,8R,9S,10R,13S,14S)-7,13-Dimethyl-1,2,6,7,8,9,10,11,12,14,15,16-dodecahydrocyclopenta[a]phenanthrene-3,17-dione
- CAS Number: 17000-78-1
- PubChem CID: 53916207
- ChemSpider: 31046848
- UNII: 25W4OLA785
- CompTox Dashboard (EPA): DTXSID00707643

Chemical and physical data
- Formula: C_{19}H_{26}O_{2}
- Molar mass: 286.415 g·mol^{−1}
- 3D model (JSmol): Interactive image
- SMILES: C[C@@H]1CC2=CC(=O)CC[C@@H]2[C@@H]3[C@@H]1[C@@H]4CCC(=O)[C@]4(CC3)C
- InChI: InChI=1S/C19H26O2/c1-11-9-12-10-13(20)3-4-14(12)15-7-8-19(2)16(18(11)15)5-6-17(19)21/h10-11,14-16,18H,3-9H2,1-2H3/t11-,14+,15-,16+,18-,19+/m1/s1; Key:IHFREKJAIFEZMQ-ARTWWJDJSA-N

7α-Methyl-19-norandrostenedione (MENT dione), or 7α-methyl-19-norandrost-4-ene-3,17-dione, also known as trestione, as well as 7α-methylestr-4-ene-3,17-dione, is a synthetic anabolic-androgenic steroid (AAS) and a derivative of 19-nortestosterone (nandrolone). It may act as a prohormone of trestolone (7α-methyl-19-nortestosterone; MENT). MENT dione has been sold on the Internet under the name Mentabolan as a "dietary supplement".

== Applications ==
1. If mentabolan is oxidized with a catalytic amount of a copper halide in the presence of oxygen it gives almestrone.
2. Mentabolan is a precursor in a recent Chinese synthesis of tibolone.
3. Mentabolan was an intermediate in the original Upjohn synthesis of mibolerone.

== See also ==
- 4-Androstenedione
- Bolandiol
- Bolandione
- Bolenol
- Dienedione
- Methoxydienone
