= Dimethandrolone =

Chemical compound

Clinical data
- Other names: CDB-1321; Dimethylnandrolone; 7α,11β-Dimethyl-19-nortestosterone; 7α,11β-Dimethylestr-4-en-17β-ol-3-one; 7α,11β-Dimethyl-19-norandrost-4-en-17β-ol-3-one
- Routes of administration: By mouth
- Drug class: Androgen; Anabolic steroid; Progestogen

Identifiers
- IUPAC name: (7R,8R,9S,10R,11S,13S,14S,17S)-17-hydroxy-7,11,13-trimethyl-2,6,7,8,9,10,11,12,14,15,16,17-dodecahydro-1H-cyclopenta[a]phenanthren-3-one
- CAS Number: 226066-52-0 366472-45-9 (undecanoate)
- PubChem CID: 9882863
- ChemSpider: 8058538
- UNII: OD742D6TJ9
- CompTox Dashboard (EPA): DTXSID001046859

Chemical and physical data
- Formula: C_{20}H_{30}O_{2}
- Molar mass: 302.458 g·mol^{−1}
- 3D model (JSmol): Interactive image
- SMILES: CC1CC2=CC(=O)CCC2C3C1C4CCC(C4(CC3C)C)O
- InChI: InChI=1S/C20H30O2/c1-11-8-13-9-14(21)4-5-15(13)18-12(2)10-20(3)16(19(11)18)6-7-17(20)22/h9,11-12,15-19,22H,4-8,10H2,1-3H3/t11-,12+,15+,16+,17+,18-,19+,20+/m1/s1; Key:KVIKZOGGZHCGFH-RJMNTABLSA-N

Dimethandrolone (DMA), also known by its developmental code name CDB-1321, is an experimental androgen/anabolic steroid (AAS) and progestogen medication which is under investigation for potential clinical use.

Dimethandrolone is an AAS, and hence is an agonist of the androgen receptor, the biological target of androgens like testosterone. It is also a progestin, or a synthetic progestogen, and hence is an agonist of the progesterone receptor, the biological target of progestogens like progesterone. Due to its androgenic and progestogenic activity, dimethandrolone has antigonadotropic effects. It has no estrogenic activity.

Dimethandrolone was first described in 1997. It was developed by the Contraceptive Development Branch of the National Institute of Child Health and Human Development, an agency in the United States government.

An ester and prodrug of dimethandrolone, dimethandrolone undecanoate (DMAU) (CDB-4521), is under development for potential use as a birth control pill for men and in androgen replacement therapy for men.

== Pharmacology ==
=== Pharmacodynamics ===
Dimethandrolone is an AAS, though it has also been described as a selective androgen receptor modulator (SARM). As an AAS, it is a potent agonist of the androgen receptor (AR).

Unlike testosterone and various other AAS, dimethandrolone is not metabolized by 5α-reductase. In addition, the 5α-reduced derivative of dimethandrolone, 5α-dihydrodimethandrolone (5α-DHDMA), possesses only 30 to 40% of the potency of dimethandrolone as an agonist of the AR, indicating that dimethandrolone does not require potentiation by 5α-reductase for its activity as an AAS and that even if it were a substrate for 5α-reductase, it would not be potentiated in androgenic tissues like the skin and prostate. As such, dimethandrolone and ester prodrugs of it like DMAU are thought to have a reduced risk of androgenic side effects and conditions such as benign prostatic hyperplasia, prostate cancer, pattern scalp hair loss, and acne relative to testosterone and certain other AAS.

Dimethandrolone is not a substrate for aromatase, and for this reason, is not converted into the corresponding aromatic A-ring derivative 7α,11β-dimethylestradiol, a potent estrogen. As such, dimethandrolone is not estrogenic. This is in contrast to nandrolone, which, although its rate of aromatization into the estrogen estradiol is reduced relative to that of testosterone, is still converted to a significant extent.

Similarly to nandrolone and other 19-nortestosterone derivatives, dimethandrolone is a potent progestogen in addition to AAS. This property may serve to augment its antigonadotropic activity, which in turn may improve its effectiveness as an antispermatogenic agent and male contraceptive. This is salient and potentially beneficial as male contraceptives based on androgens alone have failed to produce satisfactory azoospermia in around one-third of men.

Dimethandrolone has shown minimal potential for hepatotoxicity in animal studies, which is in accordance with the fact that it is not a 17α-alkylated AAS.

== Chemistry ==
Dimethandrolone, also known as 7α,11β-dimethyl-19-nortestosterone or as 7α,11β-dimethylestr-4-en-17β-ol-3-one, is a synthetic estrane steroid and a non-17α-alkylated derivative of nandrolone (19-nortestosterone).

=== Synthesis ===
The chemical synthesis has been described. Cook's alternative syntheses: The following synthesis is based on almestrone.

The starting 7a-methyl-estrone-3-methylester, PC14306575 (1) was reacted with antimony pentafluoride and hydrogen fluoride to yield a mixture of 7alpha-Methyl-estra-4,9(10)-diene-3,17-dione, PC9943709 (2a) and the isomeric by-product (2b) in a 2:1 ratio. The products were separated by chromatography to provide 39.6% yield of 2a. The 17-keto group was reduced with Lithium tri-tert-butoxyaluminum hydride (LTBA) and the product was ketalized. The product of this step was 5(10),9(11) diene due to olefin migration, PC67331809 (3). Treatment with hydrogen peroxide in hexafluoroacetone solvent gave the oxirane, (4), as a mixture of epimers, which was used for the next step without further purification. Conjugate addition of methylmagnesium bromide in the presence of a catalytic amount of cuprous chloride added to the olefin with concomitant opening of the oxirane ring to an alcohol (5). The product of this step was predominantly the 11α-methyl epimer as would be mandated based on the steric shielding of the incoming nucleophile by 18-methyl group. Treatment with acid caused deprotection of the ketal and dehydration of the alcohol (6) Ketalization with ethyleneglycol again was accompanied by olefin bond migration with the 11-methyl now occupying group an sp2 bond (7). Upon deprotecting the ketal in acid the 11-methyl group was now 90% beta stereochemistry which must reflect the thermodynamically favoured geometry of the system (8). Reduction of the diene with lithium in ammonia in the presence of a small amount of butanol reduced the compound to the C5(10) olefin (9). Migration of the remaining olefin occurred in acid to give the conjugated enone and hence dimethandrolone (10). Esterification with trans-4-Butylcyclohexane-1-carbonyl chloride (11) gave the bucyclate prodrug, CDB-4386A (12).

N.B. The deketalization steps resulted in the lowest yields. Changing the alcohol from ethylene glycol to methanol might theoretically result in higher yields since the acyclic ketal is easier to remove owing to the absence of a chelate-type of effect when ethylene glycol is used.

=== Esters ===
Aside from the C17β undecanoate ester of dimethandrolone, DMAU (CDB-4521), a few other esters, such as dimethandrolone buciclate (CDB-4386A) and dimethandrolone dodecylcarbonate (CDB-4730), have also been developed.

=== Analogues ===
Other AAS that are closely related to dimethandrolone (besides nandrolone) include trestolone (also known as 7α-methyl-19-nortestosterone (MENT)) and 11β-methyl-19-nortestosterone (11β-MNT) and their respective C17β esters trestolone acetate and 11β-MNT dodecylcarbonate (11β-MNTDC).

== History ==
A patent for dimethandrolone was filed in 1997 and was granted in 1999. Subsequently, a patent for DMAU and dimethandrolone buciclate was filed in 2002 and was granted to the United States government in 2003. Dimethandrolone was developed under the code name CDB-1321 by the Contraceptive Development Branch of the National Institute of Child Health and Human Development, one of the National Institutes of Health in the United States Department of Health and Human Services.
