= C19H23NO2 =

The molecular formula C_{19}H_{23}NO_{2} (molar mass: 297.39 g/mol, exact mass: 297.1729 u) may refer to:

- HDEP-28, or ethylnaphthidate
- Minamestane
- Trepipam
- Oxa-noribogaine
