= 3β-Hydroxytibolone =

Chemical compound

Clinical data
- Other names: ORG-30126; 7α-Methyl-17α-ethynylestr-5(10)-ene-3β,17β-diol

Identifiers
- IUPAC name: (3S,7R,8R,9S,13S,14S,17R)-17-ethynyl-7,13-dimethyl-2,3,4,6,7,8,9,11,12,14,15,16-dodecahydro-1H-cyclopenta[a]phenanthrene-3,17-diol
- CAS Number: 100239-45-0
- PubChem CID: 9839851
- ChemSpider: 8015569
- UNII: TEP8IU9GMR
- CompTox Dashboard (EPA): DTXSID301315930

Chemical and physical data
- Formula: C_{21}H_{30}O_{2}
- Molar mass: 314.469 g·mol^{−1}
- 3D model (JSmol): Interactive image
- SMILES: C[C@@H]1CC2=C(CC[C@@H](C2)O)[C@@H]3[C@@H]1[C@@H]4CC[C@]([C@]4(CC3)C)(C#C)O
- InChI: InChI=1S/C21H30O2/c1-4-21(23)10-8-18-19-13(2)11-14-12-15(22)5-6-16(14)17(19)7-9-20(18,21)3/h1,13,15,17-19,22-23H,5-12H2,2-3H3/t13-,15+,17-,18+,19-,20+,21+/m1/s1; Key:YLEUWNOTNJZCBN-XAAPQAIWSA-N

3β-Hydroxytibolone (developmental code name ORG-30126) is a synthetic steroidal estrogen which was never marketed. Along with 3α-hydroxytibolone and δ^{4}-tibolone, it is a major active metabolite of tibolone, and 3α-hydroxytibolone and 3β-hydroxytibolone are thought to be responsible for the estrogenic activity of tibolone.
