= Bolandione =

Chemical compound

Clinical data
- Other names: 19-Norandrostenedione; Estr-4-ene-3,17-dione; 19-Norandrost-4-en-3,17-dione
- Routes of administration: By mouth

Legal status
- Legal status: US: Schedule III

Identifiers
- IUPAC name: (8R,9S,10R,13S,14S)-13-Methyl-1,2,6,7,8,9,10,11,12,14,15,16-dodecahydrocyclopenta[a]phenanthrene-3,17-dione
- CAS Number: 734-32-7
- PubChem CID: 92834
- DrugBank: DB01434
- ChemSpider: 83803
- UNII: U90987PVU5
- CompTox Dashboard (EPA): DTXSID50862392
- ECHA InfoCard: 100.010.906

Chemical and physical data
- Formula: C_{18}H_{24}O_{2}
- Molar mass: 272.388 g·mol^{−1}
- 3D model (JSmol): Interactive image
- SMILES: O=C4/C=C3/CC[C@@H]2[C@H](CC[C@@]1(C(=O)CC[C@H]12)C)[C@H]3CC4
- InChI: InChI=1S/C18H24O2/c1-18-9-8-14-13-5-3-12(19)10-11(13)2-4-15(14)16(18)6-7-17(18)20/h10,13-16H,2-9H2,1H3/t13-,14+,15+,16-,18-/m0/s1; Key:JRIZOGLBRPZBLQ-QXUSFIETSA-N

Bolandione, also known as 19-norandrostenedione, as well as 19-norandrost-4-en-3,17-dione or estr-4-ene-3,17-dione, is a precursor of the anabolic-androgenic steroid (AAS) nandrolone (19-nortestosterone). Until 2005, bolandione was available without prescription in United States, where it was marketed as a prohormone, but it is now classified as a Schedule III drug. It is also banned from use in many sports, including the Olympic Games, under the World Anti-Doping Code. Bolandione is readily metabolized to nandrolone after oral administration, but its potency to transactivate the androgen receptor dependent reporter gene expression is 10 times lower as compared to dihydrotestosterone (DHT).

== Animal studies ==
Scientific studies have shown that oral administration of bolandione is "a very ineffective strategy for stimulating skeletal muscle mass increases but may be associated with side effects".

In vivo experiments in castrated rats demonstrated that subcutaneous treatment with bolandione resulted only in a stimulation of the weight of the levator ani muscle, while the prostate and seminal vesicle weights remained completely unaffected. In contrast to its metabolite nandrolone, bolandione highly selectively stimulates the growth of the skeletal muscles but has only weak androgenic properties.

== Society and culture ==
In the early 2000s, contamination of androstenedione products with traces of bolandione caused false positives for doping tests for nandrolone because 19-norandrosterone is a metabolite of both nandrolone and bolandione. In a randomized controlled trial trace contamination of androstenedione with bolandione was sufficient for users of androstenedione to test positive for nandrolone. This detail became less relevant after bolandione and 4-androstenedione were banned by major sporting bodies.

== Synthesis and applications ==
In the total synthesis, bolandione is made by Birch reduction of estrone methyl ether to nandrolone and back-oxidation of the reduced 17-keto group. Protecting the 17-position with ethylene glycol obviates the need for having to perform an oxidation step.

The semi-synthesis uses sitolactone as the starting material.

Bolandione finds use in the synthesis of norethandrolone, norethindrone, and normethandrone. Bolandione finds use in the synthesis of 6-dehydronandrolone acetate, a chemical with application in the synthesis of fulvestrant, tibolone, mibolerone, and isotibolone. A further use for bolandione is in the synthesis of 19-nordehydroepiandrosterone. One further use of bolandione is in the synthesis of allylestrenol. Bolandione finds use in the synthesis of Segesterone acetate.

== See also ==
- List of androgens/anabolic steroids
