= Almestrone =

Chemical compound

Clinical data
- Other names: Ba 38372; Ciba 38372; 7α-Methylestrone
- Routes of administration: By mouth
- Drug class: Estrogen
- ATC code: None

Identifiers
- IUPAC name: (7R,8R,9S,13S,14S)-3-hydroxy-7,13-dimethyl-7,8,9,11,12,14,15,16-octahydro-6H-cyclopenta[a]phenanthren-17-one
- CAS Number: 10448-96-1
- PubChem CID: 65601
- ChemSpider: 59042
- UNII: N18A31MTB0
- ChEMBL: ChEMBL2104052
- CompTox Dashboard (EPA): DTXSID001016949
- ECHA InfoCard: 100.212.018

Chemical and physical data
- Formula: C_{19}H_{24}O_{2}
- Molar mass: 284.399 g·mol^{−1}
- 3D model (JSmol): Interactive image
- SMILES: CC1CC2=C(C=CC(=C2)O)C3C1C4CCC(=O)C4(CC3)C
- InChI: InChI=1S/C19H24O2/c1-11-9-12-10-13(20)3-4-14(12)15-7-8-19(2)16(18(11)15)5-6-17(19)21/h3-4,10-11,15-16,18,20H,5-9H2,1-2H3/t11-,15-,16+,18-,19+/m1/s1; Key:JUAJXSMWFOFDFC-MNHDCVOLSA-N

Almestrone (INN) (developmental code names Ba 38372, Ciba 38372), also known as 7α-methylestrone, is a synthetic, steroidal estrogen which was synthesized in 1967 but was never marketed. It is used as a precursor in the synthesis of several highly active steroids.

== Applications ==
Almestrone is an intermediate in the original synthesis of tibolone by Organon. However this method of synthesis is now thought to be largely obsolete. Tibolone is used to synthesize ERA-63.

It is also used in the syntheses of dimethandrolone, dimethyldienolone, dimethyltrienolone, and other closely related compounds. They share the same precursor compound, 7α-methyl-estra-4,9(10)-diene-3,17-dione.

Another use for almestrone is in the synthesis of TAS-108.

Almesterone methyl ether can be used to make 19-nor-D-homosteroids (c.f. mibolerone).

== Synthesis ==
The original synthesis of almestrone is quite old and dates back to 1967: Aromatization method: Precursor:

The dehydrogenation of testosterone propionate (1) by chloranil gives the corresponding 4,6-diene (2). Conjugate addition of methylmagnesium bromide gives, after saponification, 7α-methyltestosterone (3) along with some of the 7β-epimer. Oxidation of the alcohol with pyridinium chlorochromate gives 7α-methylandrost-4ene-3,17-dione (4). Oxidation with DDQ gives 7α-methyl-1,4-androstadiene-3,17-dione (5). It is likely that the direction of this second dehydrogenation is mandated by the presence of the methyl group at C-7; this group may hinder the approach of reagent to the center which would lead to the alternate diene. Ketalization with ethylene glycol affords ketal 6. Elimination of the angular methyl group at C-19 with consequent aromatization is achieved by treatment of the diene with lithium in the presence of biphenyl. Deprotection of the ketal affords almestrone (7).

It can also be made from dehydronandrolone acetate. Mentabolan is oxidized with a catalytic amount of a copper halide in the presence of oxygen.

The chemical synthesis starting from trestolone acetate has alo been described.

== See also ==
- List of estrogens
- 7α-Methylestradiol
