= 3-oxosteroid 1-dehydrogenase =

Class of enzymes

Identifiers
- EC no.: 1.3.99.4
- CAS no.: 9029-04-3

Databases
- IntEnz: IntEnz view
- BRENDA: BRENDA entry
- ExPASy: NiceZyme view
- KEGG: KEGG entry
- MetaCyc: metabolic pathway
- PRIAM: profile
- PDB structures: RCSB PDB PDBe PDBsum
- Gene Ontology: AmiGO / QuickGO
Search
- PMC: articles
- PubMed: articles
- NCBI: proteins

In enzymology, 3-oxosteroid 1-dehydrogenase (EC 1.3.99.4) is an enzyme that catalyzes the chemical reaction

androstenedione
+ electron acceptor
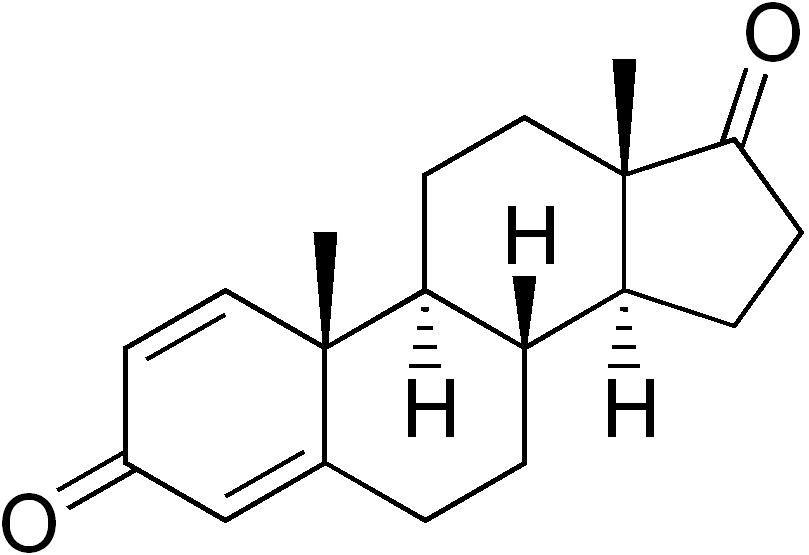
boldione
+ reduced acceptor

In the example shown, the enzyme converts androstenedione to boldione using an unknown electron acceptor. It can also convert other steroids with a keto group in the equivalent 3-position as androstenedione into 3-oxo-Delta1-steroids.

This enzyme belongs to the family of oxidoreductases, specifically those acting on the CH-CH group of donor with other acceptors. The systematic name of this enzyme class is 3-oxosteroid:acceptor Delta1-oxidoreductase. Other names in common use include 3-oxosteroid Delta1-dehydrogenase, Delta1-dehydrogenase, 3-ketosteroid-1-en-dehydrogenase, 3-ketosteroid-Delta1-dehydrogenase, 1-ene-dehydrogenase, 3-oxosteroid:(2,6-dichlorphenolindophenol) Delta1-oxidoreductase, 4-en-3-oxosteroid:(acceptor)-1-en-oxido-reductase, Delta1-steroid reductase, and 3-oxosteroid:(acceptor) Delta1-oxidoreductase.
