= 7α-Methylestradiol =

Chemical compound

Clinical data
- Other names: 7α-Methyl-E2; 7α-Me-E2; 7α-Methylestra-1,3,5(10)-triene-3,17β-diol
- Drug class: Estrogen

Identifiers
- IUPAC name: (7R,8R,9S,13S,14S,17S)-7,13-Dimethyl-6,7,8,9,11,12,14,15,16,17-decahydrocyclopenta[a]phenanthrene-3,17-diol
- CAS Number: 10448-97-2
- PubChem CID: 10424124
- ChemSpider: 8599552
- UNII: VD3UG279PS
- ChEMBL: ChEMBL1627528

Chemical and physical data
- Formula: C_{19}H_{26}O_{2}
- Molar mass: 286.415 g·mol^{−1}
- 3D model (JSmol): Interactive image
- SMILES: [H][C@@]12CC[C@H](O)[C@@]1(C)CC[C@]1([H])C3=CC=C(O)C=C3C[C@@H](C)[C@@]21[H]
- InChI: InChI=1/C19H26O2/c1-11-9-12-10-13(20)3-4-14(12)15-7-8-19(2)16(18(11)15)5-6-17(19)21/h3-4,10-11,15-18,20-21H,5-9H2,1-2H3/t11-,15-,16+,17+,18-,19+/s2; Key:DXWWYJWUFULMAP-BQXDHOISNA-N

7α-Methylestradiol (7α-Me-E2), also known as 7α-methylestra-1,3,5(10)-triene-3,17β-diol, is a synthetic estrogen and an active metabolite of the androgen/anabolic steroid Trestolone. It is considered to be responsible for the estrogenic activity of trestolone. The compound shows about higher affinity for the androgen receptor than estradiol.

Relative affinities (%) of 7α-methylestradiol and related steroids
Compound	PR	AR	ER	GR	MR	SHBG	CBG
Estradiol	2.6	7.9	100	0.6	0.13	8.7	<0.1
7α-Methylestradiol	1–3	15–25	101	<1	<1	?	?
Trestolone	50–75	100–125	?	<1	?	?	?
Values are percentages (%). Reference ligands (100%) were progesterone for the PR, testosterone for the AR, E2 for the ER, DEXA for the GR, aldosterone for the MR, DHT for SHBG, and cortisol for CBG.

== Synthesis ==
The chemical synthesis of the 17-acetate ester starting from trestolone acetate has been described (but this is old work). Alternative procedures exist, e.g.

7α-Methylestradiol can be used to prepare 7 alpha-methyl-19-nor-androstatrienes such as for example a compound that is called 3-oxo-7a-methyl-17b-acetoxy-17a-ethynyl-4-9,11-19-norandrostatriene.

== See also ==
- List of estrogens
- Methylestradiol
- Ethylestradiol
- Ethinylestradiol
- Almestrone
