= Dimethandrolone buciclate =

Chemical compound

Clinical data
- Other names: CDB-4386A; 7α,11β-Dimethyl-19-nortestosterone 17β-buciclate
- Routes of administration: Intramuscular injection
- Drug class: Androgen; Anabolic steroid; Androgen ester; Progestogen

Identifiers
- IUPAC name: (1S,2R,9R,10R,11S,14S,15S,17S)-9,15,17-Trimethyl-5-oxotetracyclo[8.7.0.0^{2,7}.0^{11,15}]heptadec-6-en-14-yl 4-butylcyclohexane-1-carboxylate
- CAS Number: 226066-59-7
- PubChem CID: 18444215
- ChemSpider: 129562401
- CompTox Dashboard (EPA): DTXSID401336945

Chemical and physical data
- Formula: C_{31}H_{48}O_{3}
- Molar mass: 468.722 g·mol^{−1}
- 3D model (JSmol): Interactive image
- SMILES: [H][C@]12CCC(=O)C=C1C[C@@H](C)[C@H]1[C@@H]3CC[C@H](OC(=O)C4CCC(CCCC)CC4)[C@@]3(C)C[C@H](C)[C@H]21
- InChI: InChI=1S/C31H48O3/c1-5-6-7-21-8-10-22(11-9-21)30(33)34-27-15-14-26-29-19(2)16-23-17-24(32)12-13-25(23)28(29)20(3)18-31(26,27)4/h17,19-22,25-29H,5-16,18H2,1-4H3/t19-,20+,21?,22?,25?,26+,27+,28-,29+,31?/m1/s1; Key:SQABEAOHFNPHNY-QFAUYDRKSA-N

Dimethandrolone buciclate (developmental code name CDB-4386A), or dimethandrolone bucyclate, also known as 7α,11β-dimethyl-19-nortestosterone 17β-buciclate, is a synthetic anabolic–androgenic steroid (AAS) and a derivative of nandrolone (19-nortestosterone) which was developed by the Contraceptive Development Branch (CDB) of the National Institute of Child Health and Human Development (NICHD) and has not been marketed at this time. It is an androgen ester – specifically, the C17β buciclate (4-butylcyclohexane-1-carboxylate) ester of dimethandrolone, (7α,11β-dimethyl-19-nortestosterone) – and acts as a prodrug of dimethandrolone in the body. Dimethandrolone buciclate is or was under investigation as a potential male contraceptive.

== See also ==
- List of androgen esters
