= Calusterone =

Chemical compound

Clinical data
- Trade names: Methosarb, Riedemil
- Other names: 7β,17α-Dimethyltestosterone; NSC-88536; U-22550
- Routes of administration: By mouth

Identifiers
- IUPAC name: (7S,8R,9S,10R,13S,14S,17S)-17-hydroxy-7,10,13,17-tetramethyl-6,7,8,9,10,11,12,13,14,15,16,17-dodecahydro-1H-cyclopenta[a]phenanthren-3(2H)-one
- CAS Number: 17021-26-0
- PubChem CID: 28204
- DrugBank: DB01564
- ChemSpider: 26239
- UNII: 0678G6Q58A
- KEGG: D03338
- ChEMBL: ChEMBL455706
- CompTox Dashboard (EPA): DTXSID0022723

Chemical and physical data
- Formula: C_{21}H_{32}O_{2}
- Molar mass: 316.485 g·mol^{−1}
- 3D model (JSmol): Interactive image
- SMILES: O=C4\C=C3/[C@]([C@H]2CC[C@]1([C@@H](CC[C@@]1(O)C)[C@@H]2[C@@H](C)C3)C)(C)CC4
- InChI: InChI=1S/C21H32O2/c1-13-11-14-12-15(22)5-8-19(14,2)16-6-9-20(3)17(18(13)16)7-10-21(20,4)23/h12-13,16-18,23H,5-11H2,1-4H3/t13-,16-,17-,18+,19-,20-,21-/m0/s1; Key:IVFYLRMMHVYGJH-PVPPCFLZSA-N

Calusterone (INN, USAN) (brand names Methosarb, Riedemil; former developmental code names NSC-88536, U-22550), also known as 7β,17α-dimethyltestosterone, is an orally active anabolic-androgenic steroid (AAS) that is used as an antineoplastic agent. It is a 17α-alkylated AAS similar in structure to bolasterone (which is its 7α-isomer).

Androgen/anabolic steroid dosages for breast cancer
Route	Medication	Form	Dosage
Oral	Methyltestosterone	Tablet	30–200 mg/day
Oral	Fluoxymesterone	Tablet	10–40 mg 3x/day
Oral	Calusterone	Tablet	40–80 mg 4x/day
Oral	Normethandrone	Tablet	40 mg/day
Buccal	Methyltestosterone	Tablet	25–100 mg/day
Injection (IM or SC)	Testosterone propionate	Oil solution	50–100 mg 3x/week
Injection (IM or SC)	Testosterone enanthate	Oil solution	200–400 mg 1x/2–4 weeks
Injection (IM or SC)	Testosterone cypionate	Oil solution	200–400 mg 1x/2–4 weeks
Injection (IM or SC)	Mixed testosterone esters	Oil solution	250 mg 1x/week
Injection (IM or SC)	Methandriol	Aqueous suspension	100 mg 3x/week
Injection (IM or SC)	Androstanolone (DHT)	Aqueous suspension	300 mg 3x/week
Injection (IM or SC)	Drostanolone propionate	Oil solution	100 mg 1–3x/week
Injection (IM or SC)	Metenolone enanthate	Oil solution	400 mg 3x/week
Injection (IM or SC)	Nandrolone decanoate	Oil solution	50–100 mg 1x/1–3 weeks
Injection (IM or SC)	Nandrolone phenylpropionate	Oil solution	50–100 mg/week
Note: Dosages are not necessarily equivalent. Sources: See template.

Calusterone is on the World Anti-Doping Agency's list of prohibited substances, and is therefore banned from use in most major sports.
