= 11β-Methyl-19-nortestosterone =

Chemical compound

Clinical data
- Other names: 11β-MNT; 11β-Methylestr-4-en-17β-ol-3-one
- Routes of administration: By mouth
- Drug class: Androgen; Anabolic steroid; Progestogen

Identifiers
- IUPAC name: (8R,9S,10R,11S,13S,14S,17S)-17-hydroxy-11,13-dimethyl-2,6,7,8,9,10,11,12,14,15,16,17-dodecahydro-1H-cyclopenta[a]phenanthren-3-one
- CAS Number: 18046-77-0 904901-01-5 (dodecylcarbonate)
- PubChem CID: 68648057
- ChemSpider: 52085460
- UNII: 7HK4M3941F
- CompTox Dashboard (EPA): DTXSID001252268

Chemical and physical data
- Formula: C_{19}H_{28}O_{2}
- Molar mass: 288.431 g·mol^{−1}
- 3D model (JSmol): Interactive image
- SMILES: C[C@H]1C[C@]2(C)[C@@H](O)CC[C@H]2[C@@H]3CCC4=CC(=O)CC[C@@H]4[C@@H]13
- InChI: InChI=1S/C19H28O2/c1-11-10-19(2)16(7-8-17(19)21)15-5-3-12-9-13(20)4-6-14(12)18(11)15/h9,11,14-18,21H,3-8,10H2,1-2H3/t11-,14-,15-,16-,17-,18+,19-/m0/s1; Key:QCNNHARIRLYUAB-CTPXPINYSA-N

11β-Methyl-19-nortestosterone (11β-MNT) is a synthetic and orally active anabolic–androgenic steroid (AAS) and a derivative of nandrolone (19-nortestosterone) which was developed by the Contraceptive Development Branch (CDB) of the National Institute of Child Health and Human Development (NICHD) and has not been marketed at this time.

The C17β dodecylcarbonate ester of 11β-MNT, 11β-methyl-19-nortestosterone 17β-dodecylcarbonate (11β-MNTDC) (CDB-4754), is a prodrug of 11β-MNT. Along with the closely related AAS dimethandrolone (7α,11β-dimethyl-19-nortestosterone; CDB-1321) and its ester prodrug dimethandrolone undecanoate (CDB-4521), 11β-MNT and 11β-MNTDC are under investigation as potential male contraceptives and to treat male hypogonadism.

== Pharmacology ==
=== Pharmacodynamics ===
11β-MNT does not undergo aromatization into the corresponding estrogenic metabolite 11β-methylestradiol, and for this reason, has no potential for estrogenic side effects such as gynecomastia. In addition, unlike testosterone, 11β-MNT does not appear to undergo 5α-reduction into the corresponding 5α-dihydrogenated metabolite 5α-dihydro-11β-MNT (5α-DHMNT). This conclusion is based on the fact that 5α-DHMNT is 4 to 8 times as potent as 11β-MNT in terms of androgenicity in animal bioassays, yet the co-administration of the 5α-reductase inhibitor dutasteride with 11β-MNT had no influence on its potency in assays using tissues that express 5α-reductase like the ventral prostate and seminal vesicles. Due to lack of potentiation by 5α-reductase in androgenic tissues like the skin, hair follicles, and prostate gland, 11β-MNT may have a lower risk of certain side effects such as oily skin, acne, androgenic alopecia (pattern hair loss), prostate enlargement, and prostate cancer than testosterone and certain other AAS.

Similarly to nandrolone, dimethandrolone, and other 19-nortestosterone derivatives, 11β-MNT has been found to possess progestogenic activity. Because of its dual activity as an AAS and progestogen, 11β-MNT may have greater efficacy in suppression of spermatogenesis and hence male fertility than pure AAS like testosterone.

Oral 11β-MNT has shown little to no potential for hepatotoxicity in animals, similarly to testosterone but unlike 17α-alkylated AAS like methyltestosterone. The drug notably shows a much lower hepatotoxic potential than dimethandrolone and trestolone (7α-methyl-19-nortestosterone; MENT), which may have an increased risk due to their shared C7α methyl group (although a risk that is still significantly lower than that of 17α-alkylated AAS).

== Chemistry ==
11β-MNT, or 11β-methyl-19-nortestosterone, also known as 11β-methylestr-4-en-17β-ol-3-one, is a synthetic estrane steroid and a non-17α-alkylated derivative of nandrolone (19-nortestosterone).
