= 11β-Methyl-19-nortestosterone dodecylcarbonate =

Chemical compound

Clinical data
- Other names: 11β-MNTDC; CDB-4754
- Routes of administration: By mouth, intramuscular injection
- Drug class: Androgen; Anabolic steroid; Androgen ester; Progestogen

Identifiers
- IUPAC name: [(8R,9S,10R,11S,13S,14S,17S)-11,13-dimethyl-3-oxo-2,6,7,8,9,10,11,12,14,15,16,17-dodecahydro-1H-cyclopenta[a]phenanthren-17-yl] dodecyl carbonate
- CAS Number: 904901-01-5
- PubChem CID: 68648455
- ChemSpider: 52085304
- UNII: 906T1U911E
- CompTox Dashboard (EPA): DTXSID701168521

Chemical and physical data
- Formula: C_{32}H_{52}O_{4}
- Molar mass: 500.764 g·mol^{−1}
- 3D model (JSmol): Interactive image
- SMILES: CCCCCCCCCCCCOC(=O)O[C@H]1CC[C@H]2[C@@H]3CCC4=CC(=O)CC[C@@H]4[C@H]3[C@@H](C)C[C@]12C
- InChI: InChI=1S/C32H52O4/c1-4-5-6-7-8-9-10-11-12-13-20-35-31(34)36-29-19-18-28-27-16-14-24-21-25(33)15-17-26(24)30(27)23(2)22-32(28,29)3/h21,23,26-30H,4-20,22H2,1-3H3/t23-,26-,27-,28-,29-,30+,32-/m0/s1; Key:JVTCGMMASZPYDR-UIRZMXPTSA-N

11β-Methyl-19-nortestosterone 17β-dodecylcarbonate (11β-MNTDC) (developmental code name CDB-4754) is a synthetic and orally active anabolic–androgenic steroid (AAS) and a derivative of nandrolone (19-nortestosterone) which was developed by the Contraceptive Development Branch (CDB) of the National Institute of Child Health and Human Development (NICHD) and has not been marketed for medical use at this time. It is an androgen ester – specifically, the C17β dodecylcarbonate ester of 11β-methyl-19-nortestosterone (11β-MNT) – and acts as a prodrug of 11β-MNT in the body.

11β-MNTDC is under development as a birth control pill for men. It has been described as the "sister compound" of dimethandrolone undecanoate, which is also under development as a birth control pill for men.

Because 11β-MNTDC is not 5α-reduced, in contrast to testosterone, it may have less risk of scalp hair loss.

== See also ==
- List of androgen esters § Esters of other synthetic AAS
- List of investigational sex-hormonal agents § Androgenics
