= Minamestane =

Chemical compound

Clinical data
- ATC code: None

Identifiers
- IUPAC name: 4-aminoandrosta-1,4,6-triene-3,17-dione
- CAS Number: 105051-87-4
- PubChem CID: 65886
- ChemSpider: 59295
- UNII: J02058ABVE
- CompTox Dashboard (EPA): DTXSID40883152

Chemical and physical data
- Formula: C_{19}H_{23}NO_{2}
- Molar mass: 297.398 g·mol^{−1}
- 3D model (JSmol): Interactive image
- SMILES: O=C4\C=C/[C@]3(C(/C=C\[C@H]2[C@H]1[C@@](C(=O)CC1)(CC[C@@H]23)C)=C4/N)C
- InChI: InChI=1S/C19H23NO2/c1-18-10-8-15(21)17(20)14(18)4-3-11-12-5-6-16(22)19(12,2)9-7-13(11)18/h3-4,8,10-13H,5-7,9,20H2,1-2H3/t11-,12-,13-,18+,19-/m0/s1; Key:DAKHYLIFCYPHQW-KZQROQTASA-N

Minamestane (INN (former developmental code name FCE-24,928) is a steroidal aromatase inhibitor which was under development by Farmitalia-Carlo Erba as an antineoplastic agent in the mid-1990s but was never marketed.

Unlike other steroidal aromatase inhibitors such as formestane and exemestane, minamestane does not have androgenic properties.

== See also ==
- Plomestane
