= Δ4-Tibolone =

Chemical compound

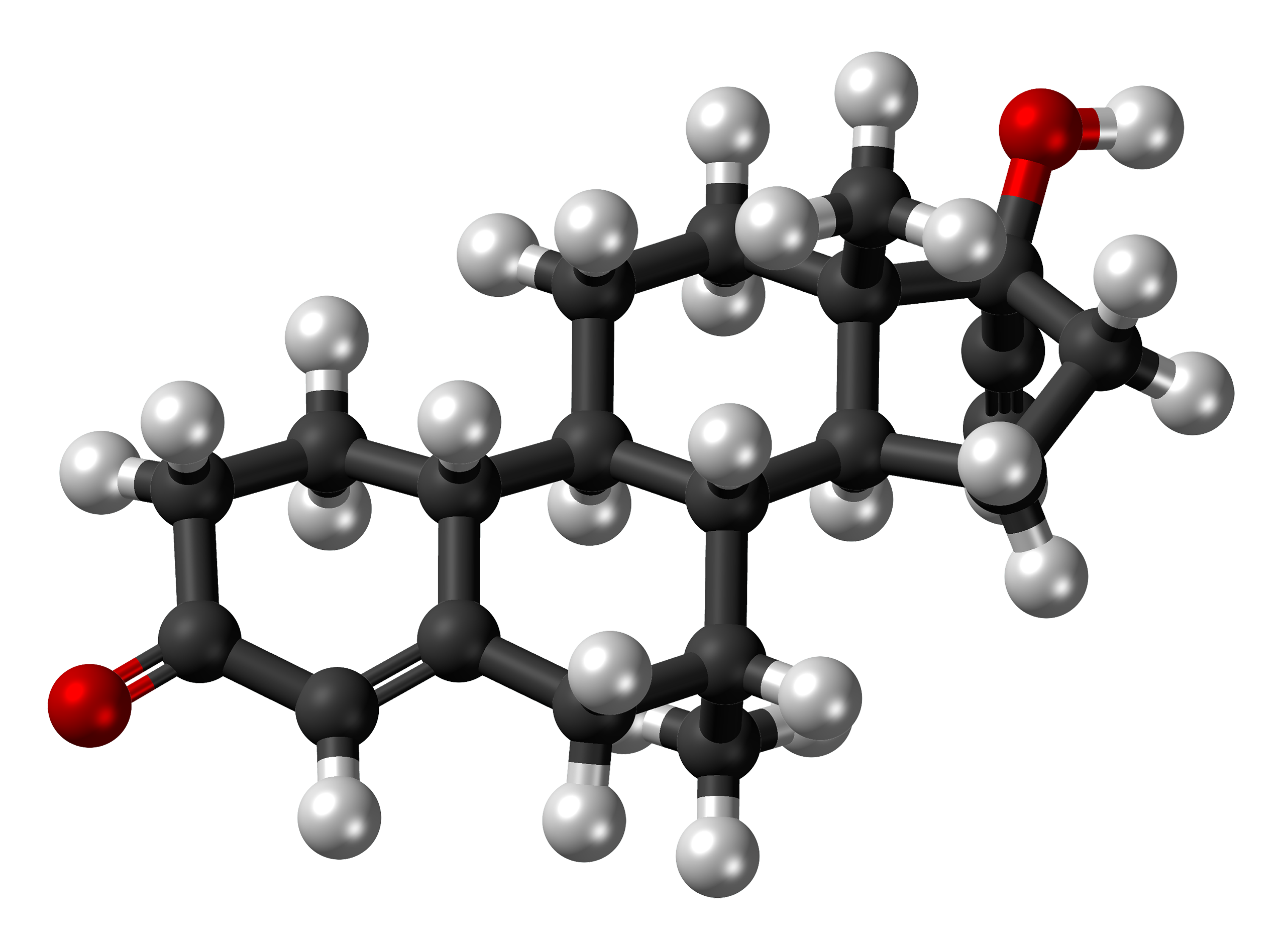

Clinical data
- Other names: Isotibolone; ORG-OM-38; Delta-4-Tibolone; 7α-Methylnorethisterone; 7α-Methyl-17α-ethynyl-19-nortestosterone; 17α-Ethynyl-17β-hydroxy-7α-methyl-4-estren-3-one

Identifiers
- IUPAC name: (7R,8R,9S,10R,13S,14S,17R)-17-Ethynyl-17-hydroxy-7,13-dimethyl-1,2,6,7,8,9,10,11,12,14,15,16-dodecahydrocyclopenta[a]phenanthren-3-one
- CAS Number: 1162-60-3
- PubChem CID: 22814761
- ChemSpider: 18532860
- UNII: LHZ8R2OW0M

Chemical and physical data
- Formula: C_{21}H_{28}O_{2}
- Molar mass: 312.453 g·mol^{−1}
- 3D model (JSmol): Interactive image
- SMILES: C[C@@H]1CC2=CC(=O)CC[C@@H]2[C@@H]3[C@@H]1[C@@H]4CC[C@]([C@]4(CC3)C)(C#C)O
- InChI: InChI=1S/C21H28O2/c1-4-21(23)10-8-18-19-13(2)11-14-12-15(22)5-6-16(14)17(19)7-9-20(18,21)3/h1,12-13,16-19,23H,5-11H2,2-3H3/t13-,16+,17-,18+,19-,20+,21+/m1/s1; Key:WAOKMNBZWBGYIK-KIURNNQRSA-N

δ^{4}-Tibolone (developmental code ORG-OM-38; also known as isotibolone, 7α-methylnorethisterone, or 7α-methyl-17α-ethynyl-19-nortestosterone) is a synthetic androgen and progestin which was never marketed. The compound is a major active metabolite of tibolone, which itself is a prodrug of δ^{4}-tibolone along with 3α-hydroxytibolone and 3β-hydroxytibolone (which, in contrast to δ^{4}-tibolone, are estrogens). Tibolone and δ^{4}-tibolone are thought to be responsible for the androgenic and progestogenic activity of tibolone, while 3α-hydroxytibolone and 3β-hydroxytibolone are thought to be responsible for its estrogenic activity.

== Activity ==
Isotibolone exhibited both estrogenic and progestogenic properties in several biological test systems and was found to be 10 to 40 times as potent as norethindrone in comparative assays. Tested for androgenic activity, it stimulated growth of seminal vesicles and the levator ani but was relatively inactive in stimulating prostate gland growth.

== See also ==
- List of androgens/anabolic steroids
- List of progestogens
