= Dimethandrolone dodecylcarbonate =

Chemical compound

Clinical data
- Other names: CDB-4730; Dimethandrolone dodecanoylcarbonate; Dimethandrolone 17β-dodecylcarbonate; 7α,11β-Dimethyl-19-nortestosterone 17β-dodecylcarbonate
- Routes of administration: By mouth, intramuscular injection
- Drug class: Androgen; Anabolic steroid; Progestogen

Identifiers
- IUPAC name: dodecyl (1S,2R,9R,10R,11S,14S,15S,17S)-9,15,17-trimethyl-5-oxotetracyclo[8.7.0.0^{2,7}.0^{11,15}]heptadec-6-en-14-yl carbonate
- CAS Number: 905287-57-2
- PubChem CID: 11605987
- ChemSpider: 9780743
- CompTox Dashboard (EPA): DTXSID801336947

Chemical and physical data
- Formula: C_{33}H_{54}O_{4}
- Molar mass: 514.791 g·mol^{−1}
- 3D model (JSmol): Interactive image
- SMILES: [H][C@]12CCC(=O)C=C1C[C@@H](C)[C@H]1[C@@H]3CC[C@H](OC(=O)OCCCCCCCCCCCC)[C@@]3(C)C[C@H](C)[C@H]21
- InChI: InChI=1S/C33H54O4/c1-5-6-7-8-9-10-11-12-13-14-19-36-32(35)37-29-18-17-28-31-23(2)20-25-21-26(34)15-16-27(25)30(31)24(3)22-33(28,29)4/h21,23-24,27-31H,5-20,22H2,1-4H3/t23-,24+,27?,28+,29+,30-,31+,33?/m1/s1; Key:XBTJAJJKGSKQCS-BFKPOJPOSA-N

Dimethandrolone dodecylcarbonate (developmental code name CDB-4730), or dimethandrolone dodecanoylcarbonate, also known as 7α,11β-dimethyl-19-nortestosterone 17β-dodecylcarbonate, is a synthetic and orally active anabolic–androgenic steroid (AAS) and a derivative of nandrolone (19-nortestosterone) which was developed by the Contraceptive Development Branch (CDB) of the National Institute of Child Health and Human Development (NICHD) and has not been marketed at this time. It is an androgen ester – specifically, the C17β dodecylcarbonate ester of dimethandrolone (7α,11β-dimethyl-19-nortestosterone) – and acts as a prodrug of dimethandrolone in the body.

== See also ==
- List of androgen esters
