= Bolasterone =

Chemical compound

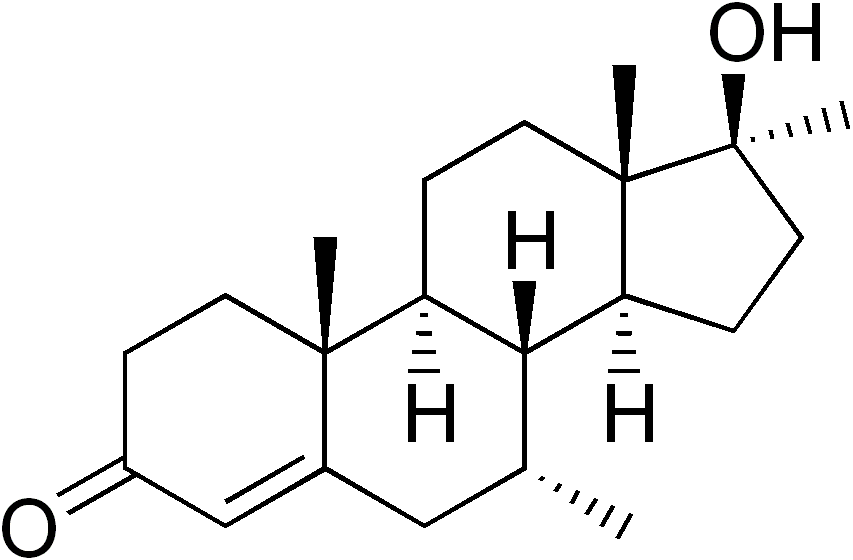

Clinical data
- Trade names: Myagen, Methosarb
- Other names: U-19763; NSC-66233; 7α,17α-Dimethyltestosterone; 7α,17α-Dimethylandrost-4-en-17β-ol-3-one, Piratestosterone.
- Routes of administration: By mouth

Legal status
- Legal status: BR: Class C5 (Anabolic steroids)

Identifiers
- IUPAC name: (7R,8R,9S,10R,13S,14S,17S)-17-hydroxy-7,10,13,17-tetramethyl-2,6,7,8,9,11,12,14,15,16-decahydro-1H-cyclopenta[a]phenanthren-3-one
- CAS Number: 1605-89-6
- PubChem CID: 102146
- ChemSpider: 92280
- UNII: T7ZM08F7FU
- ChEMBL: ChEMBL259548
- CompTox Dashboard (EPA): DTXSID40166896
- ECHA InfoCard: 100.015.018

Chemical and physical data
- Formula: C_{21}H_{32}O_{2}
- Molar mass: 316.485 g·mol^{−1}
- 3D model (JSmol): Interactive image
- SMILES: O=C4\C=C3/[C@]([C@H]2CC[C@]1([C@@H](CC[C@@]1(O)C)[C@@H]2[C@H](C)C3)C)(C)CC4
- InChI: InChI=1S/C21H32O2/c1-13-11-14-12-15(22)5-8-19(14,2)16-6-9-20(3)17(18(13)16)7-10-21(20,4)23/h12-13,16-18,23H,5-11H2,1-4H3/t13-,16+,17+,18-,19+,20+,21+/m1/s1; Key:IVFYLRMMHVYGJH-VLOLGRDOSA-N

Bolasterone (INN, USAN) (brand names Myagen, Methosarb; former developmental code name U-19763), also known as 7α,17α-dimethyltestosterone, is a 17α-alkylated androgen/anabolic steroid (AAS) which is used in veterinary medicine. It has close structural similarity to testosterone, and like methyltestosterone has a methyl group at C17α in order to increase oral bioavailability. In addition, it is also 7α-methylated, similar to its 7β-methylated isomer calusterone. The medication has a low to moderate ratio of anabolic to androgenic activity, similar to that of fluoxymesterone.

Bolasterone is on the World Anti-Doping Agency's list of prohibited substances, and is therefore banned from use in most major sports. The medication was initially developed by Upjohn for veterinary use and was stolen by the East German Stasi for use in athletes by the Forschungsinstitut für Körperkultur und Sport (FKS) in the German Democratic Republic.

== Chemistry ==
=== Synthesis ===
The chemical synthesis was reported: Patent:

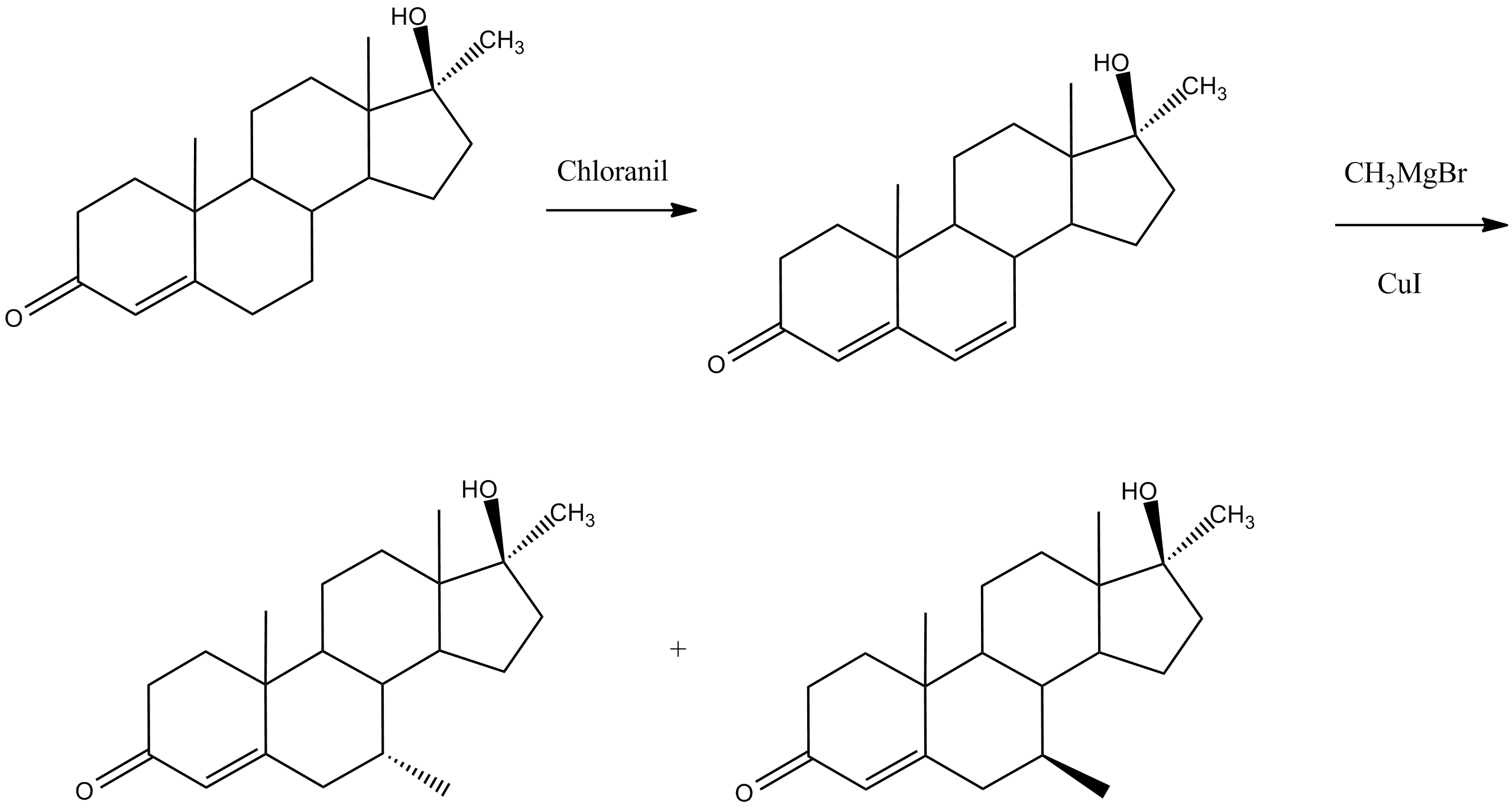

The oxidation of methyltestosterone [58-18-4] (1) with chloranil gives 17alpha-methyl-6,7-dehydrotestosterone [5585-85-3] (2). The conjugate addition of methylmagnesium bromide in the presence of a catalytic amount of cuprous iodide (c.f. Gilman reagent) gives a mixture of bolasterone and calusterone, with the former predominating.

== See also ==
- Mibolerone (19-normethyl-bolasterone)
