= Plomestane =

Chemical compound

Clinical data
- Other names: MDL-18962; Propargylestrenedione; PED; 10-(2-Propyn-1-yl)estr-4-ene-3,17-dione; 10-Propargylestr-4-ene-3,17-dione
- ATC code: None

Identifiers
- IUPAC name: 10H-(2-Propynyl)-estr-4-ene-3,17-dione
- CAS Number: 77016-85-4
- PubChem CID: 9904788
- ChemSpider: 8080442
- UNII: FL3VS913TW
- CompTox Dashboard (EPA): DTXSID601318490

Chemical and physical data
- Formula: C_{21}H_{26}O_{2}
- Molar mass: 310.437 g·mol^{−1}
- 3D model (JSmol): Interactive image
- SMILES: O=C4\C=C3/[C@@](CC#C)([C@H]2CC[C@@]1(C(=O)CC[C@H]1[C@@H]2CC3)C)CC4
- InChI: InChI=1S/C21H26O2/c1-3-10-21-12-8-15(22)13-14(21)4-5-16-17-6-7-19(23)20(17,2)11-9-18(16)21/h1,13,16-18H,4-12H2,2H3/t16-,17-,18-,20-,21-/m0/s1; Key:JKPDEYAOCSQBSZ-OEUJLIAZSA-N

Plomestane (INN, USAN; former developmental code name MDL-18962; also known as propargylestrenedione, PED) is a steroidal, irreversible aromatase inhibitor which was under development by Marion Merrell Dow/Hoechst Marion Russell (now Hoechst AG) as an antineoplastic agent for the treatment of breast cancer. It was found to be effective in preclinical studies and was also found to produce few adverse effects in human clinical trials, significantly reducing estrogen levels with a single administration. However, development of the drug for clinical use was halted due to "technical issues" and it was never marketed.

In addition to its activity as an aromatase inhibitor, plomestane has weak androgenic properties.

== Synthesis ==
The chemical synthesis was described: Patent:

Ketalization of Estr-5(10)-ene-3,17-dione [3962-66-1] (1) with two equivalents of ethylene glycol gives (2). Addition of NBS in water and hence hypobromous acid adds across the olefin to give (3). This rearranges to the oxirane in the presence of sodium methoxide base (4). The Gilman reagent was prepared from 1-(Trimethylsilyl)-1-propyne [6224-91-5] (6) and the reaction gave (7). Removal of the ketal protecting groups in acid, PC11784353 (8) and removal of the trimethyl silyl protecting group in base occurred with concomitant dehydration of the alcohol, completing the synthesis of plomestane (9).

== See also ==
- Minamestane
