= Boldione =

Chemical compound

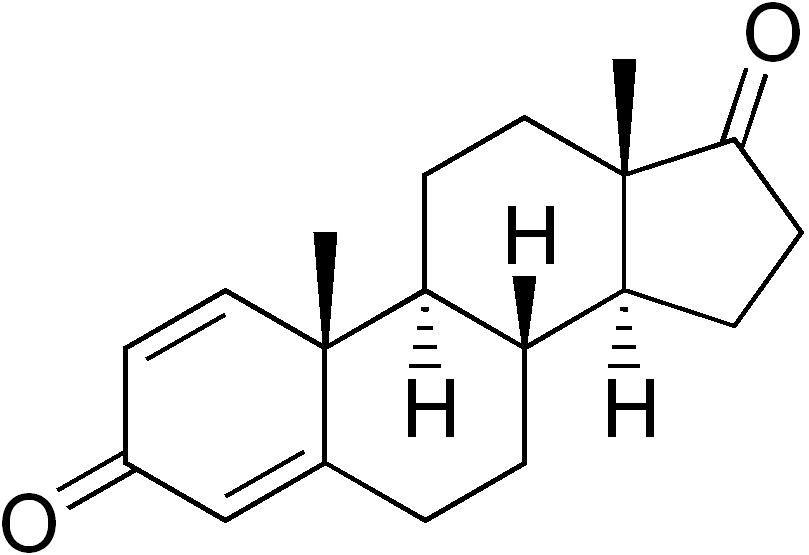

Clinical data
- Other names: 1,4-Androstadiene-3,17-dione; 1-Dehydroandrostenedione; androsta-1,4-diene-3,17-dione; ADD
- Routes of administration: Oral

Identifiers
- IUPAC name: (8R,9S,10R,13S,14S)-10,13-dimethyl-7,8,9,11,12,14,15,16-octahydro-6H-cyclopenta[a]phenanthrene-3,17-dione
- CAS Number: 897-06-3
- PubChem CID: 13472
- ChemSpider: 12893
- UNII: 2166Q8568W
- ChEBI: CHEBI:40799
- ChEMBL: ChEMBL1078534
- CompTox Dashboard (EPA): DTXSID00862463
- ECHA InfoCard: 100.011.798

Chemical and physical data
- Formula: C_{19}H_{24}O_{2}
- Molar mass: 284.399 g·mol^{−1}
- 3D model (JSmol): Interactive image
- SMILES: O=C\1\C=C/[C@]3(/C(=C/1)CC[C@H]4[C@@H]2CCC(=O)[C@]2(CC[C@H]34)C)C
- InChI: InChI=1S/C19H24O2/c1-18-9-7-13(20)11-12(18)3-4-14-15-5-6-17(21)19(15,2)10-8-16(14)18/h7,9,11,14-16H,3-6,8,10H2,1-2H3/t14-,15-,16-,18-,19-/m0/s1; Key:LUJVUUWNAPIQQI-QAGGRKNESA-N

Boldione, also known as androstadienedione or 1-dehydroandrostenedione, as well as 1,4-androstadiene-3,17-dione, is an important industrial precursor for various steroid hormones. In the United States the chemical is regulated as a Schedule III Controlled Substance.

== Uses ==
Androstadienedione is an important industrial-scale precursor for a wide variety of steroid hormones within the estrane and androstane classifications. For example, boldione was recently used in the synthesis of estrogen. Additionally, it has been used in the synthesis of testolactone (via a Baeyer-villiger rearrangement) and of atamestane. Boldione was used in a synthesis of 1-Testosterone.

== Preparation ==
Androstadienedione is obtained in high yield from both plant and animal sterols by biotransformation. The chemical is a common byproduct derived from other processes (e.g. vegetable oil deodorization and the production of lanolin from wool processing). The product is produced from cholesterol by a bacteria in a single step via a simultaneous side-chain cleavage at the C17 position and an alcohol oxidation in the C3 position.

=== Biosynthesis ===
The enzyme 3-oxosteroid 1-dehydrogenase produces boldione from androstenedione:

androstenedione
+ electron acceptor
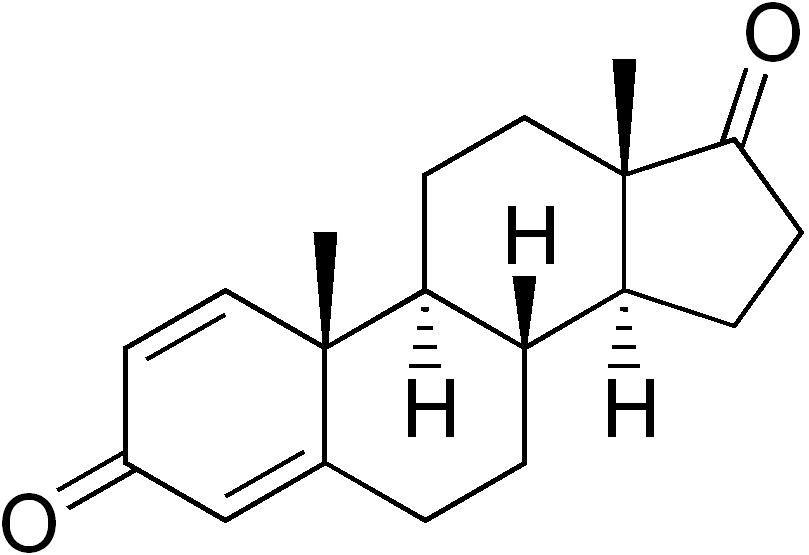
boldione
+ reduced acceptor

== Regulation ==
=== United States ===
In 2004 the United States Congress passed the Anabolic Steroid Control Act of 2005 which placed 36 steroids and over-the-counter prohormones into schedule III of the Controlled Substances Act. In this legislation boldenone was classified as a controlled substance and boldione remained legal. In April 2008 the United States Drug Enforcement Administration published an "Initial Notice of Proposed Rulemaking" concerning the scheduling of three anabolic substances: boldione, desoxymethyltestosterone, and dienedione. In 2008, at the time of the proposal, these three substances were listed as ingredients in more than 58 dietary supplements which were available for purchase over the counter. Effective January 4, 2010 these three chemicals, including boldione, were classified as Schedule III Controlled Substances and became illegal in the United States.

=== WADA ===
Boldione is on the World Anti-Doping Agency's list of prohibited substances, and is therefore banned from use in most major sports.
