= Dimethyltrienolone =

Anabolic–androgenic steroid

Clinical data
- Other names: RU-2420; 7α,17α-Dimethyltrenbolone; 7α,17α-Dimethyl-δ^{9,11}-19-nortestosterone; 7α,17α-Dimethylestra-4,9,11-trien-17β-ol-3-one
- Routes of administration: By mouth
- Drug class: Androgen; Anabolic steroid; Progestogen

Identifiers
- IUPAC name: (7R,8S,13S,14S,17S)-17-hydroxy-7,13,17-trimethyl-1,2,6,7,8,14,15,16-octahydrocyclopenta[a]phenanthren-3-one
- CAS Number: 10110-86-8
- PubChem CID: 101678228
- ChemSpider: 23208745
- UNII: 8GP0J5637H
- ChEMBL: ChEMBL128880

Chemical and physical data
- Formula: C_{20}H_{26}O_{2}
- Molar mass: 298.426 g·mol^{−1}
- 3D model (JSmol): Interactive image
- SMILES: C[C@@H]1CC2=CC(=O)CCC2=C3[C@@H]1[C@@H]4CC[C@]([C@]4(C=C3)C)(C)O
- InChI: InChI=1S/C20H26O2/c1-12-10-13-11-14(21)4-5-15(13)16-6-8-19(2)17(18(12)16)7-9-20(19,3)22/h6,8,11-12,17-18,22H,4-5,7,9-10H2,1-3H3/t12-,17+,18-,19+,20+/m1/s1; Key:MEMDJKLEPFFNQS-ZGPIAVDESA-N

Dimethyltrienolne (developmental code name RU-2420) is a synthetic, orally active, and extremely potent anabolic–androgenic steroid (AAS) and 17α-alkylated 19-nortestosterone (nandrolone) derivative which was never marketed for medical use. It has among the highest known affinity of any AAS for the androgen (and progesterone) receptors, and has been said to be perhaps the most potent AAS to have ever been developed.

== Pharmacology ==
=== Pharmacodynamics ===
Dimethyltrienolone is an extremely potent agonist of the androgen and progesterone receptors and hence AAS and progestogen. In animal bioassays, it was shown to possess more than 100 times the anabolic and androgenic potency of the reference AAS methyltestosterone. The drug is not a substrate for 5α-reductase and so is not potentiated or inactivated in so-called "androgenic" tissues like the prostate gland or skin. It is also not a substrate for aromatase and so has no estrogenic activity. Due to its lack of estrogenicity, dimethyltrienolone has no propensity for causing estrogenic side effects like gynecomastia. Because of its C17α methyl group and very high resistance to hepatic metabolism, dimethyltrienolone is said to be exceedingly hepatotoxic.

Relative affinities (%) of dimethyltrienolone and related steroids
Compound	Chemical name	PR	AR	ER	GR	MR
Testosterone	T	1.0	100	<0.1	0.17	0.9
Nandrolone	19-NT	20	154	<0.1	0.5	1.6
Trenbolone	∆^{9,11}-19-NT	74	197	<0.1	2.9	1.33
Trestolone	7α-Me-19-NT	50–75	100–125	?	<1	?
Normethandrone	17α-Me-19-NT	100	146	<0.1	1.5	0.6
Metribolone	∆^{9,11}-17α-Me-19-NT	208	204	<0.1	26	18
Mibolerone	7α,17α-DiMe-19-NT	214	108	<0.1	1.4	2.1
Dimethyltrienolone	∆^{9,11}-7α,17α-DiMe-19-NT	306	180	0.1	22	52
Values are percentages (%). Reference ligands (100%) were progesterone for the PR, testosterone for the AR, estradiol for the ER, DEXA for the GR, and aldosterone for the MR.

== Chemistry ==
Dimethyltrienolone, also known as 7α,17α-dimethyl-δ^{9,11}-19-nortestosterone or as 7α,17α-dimethylestra-4,9,11-trien-17β-ol-3-one, as well as 7α,17α-dimethyltrenbolone, is a synthetic estrane steroid and a 17α-alkylated derivative of nandrolone (19-nortestosterone). It is the 7α,17α-dimethyl derivative of trenbolone and the 7α-methyl derivative of metribolone, as well as the δ^{9,11} analogue of metribolone and the δ^{9,11}, 17α-methylated derivative of trestolone.

Dimethyltrienolone can be congenially prepared from almestrone.

== History ==
Dimethyltrienolone was first described in 1967. It was never marketed for medical use.

== See also ==
- Tetrahydrogestrinone
- Trimethyltrienolone
