= Trestolone acetate =

Chemical compound

Clinical data
- Other names: Orgasteron acetate; MENT acetate; CDB-903; NSC-69948; U-15614; 7α-Methyl-19-nortestosterone 17β-acetate; 7α-Methylestr-4-en-17β-ol-3-one 17β-acetate
- Routes of administration: Intramuscular injection
- Drug class: Androgen; Anabolic steroid; Androgen ester; Progestogen; Antigonadotropin

Identifiers
- IUPAC name: [(7R,8R,9S,10R,13S,14S,17S)-7,13-dimethyl-3-oxo-2,6,7,8,9,10,11,12,14,15,16,17-dodecahydro-1H-cyclopenta[a]phenanthren-17-yl] acetate
- CAS Number: 6157-87-5
- PubChem CID: 10246085
- DrugBank: DB13958
- ChemSpider: 8421572
- UNII: 52XDF4N1XL
- ChEMBL: ChEMBL452329
- CompTox Dashboard (EPA): DTXSID80977160

Chemical and physical data
- Formula: C_{21}H_{30}O_{3}
- Molar mass: 330.468 g·mol^{−1}
- 3D model (JSmol): Interactive image
- SMILES: C[C@@H]1CC2=CC(=O)CC[C@@H]2[C@@H]3[C@@H]1[C@@H]4CC[C@@H]([C@]4(CC3)C)OC(=O)C
- InChI: InChI=1S/C21H30O3/c1-12-10-14-11-15(23)4-5-16(14)17-8-9-21(3)18(20(12)17)6-7-19(21)24-13(2)22/h11-12,16-20H,4-10H2,1-3H3/t12-,16+,17-,18+,19+,20-,21+/m1/s1; Key:IVCRCPJOLWECJU-XQVQQVTHSA-N

Trestolone acetate (USAN; developmental code names CDB-903, NSC-69948, U-15614; also known as 7α-methyl-19-nortestosterone 17β-acetate (MENT acetate) and 7α-methylestr-4-en-17β-ol-3-one 17β-acetate) is a synthetic and injected anabolic–androgenic steroid (AAS) and a derivative of nandrolone (19-nortestosterone) which was never marketed. It is an androgen ester – specifically, the C17 acetate ester of trestolone (7α-methyl-19-nortestosterone; MENT). The medication was first described in 1963.

U-15,614 is the precursor used in the improved synthesis of tibolone.

== See also ==
- List of androgen esters
