= Mibolerone =

Chemical compound

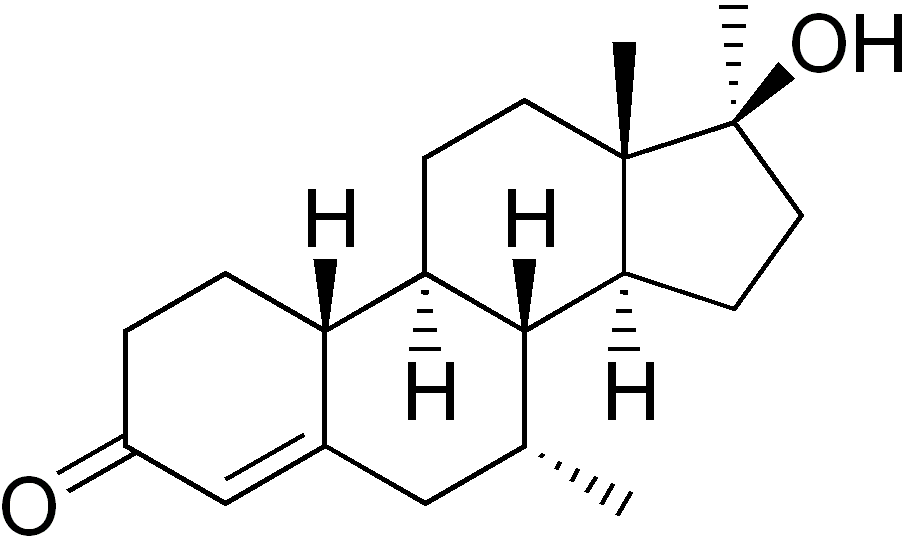

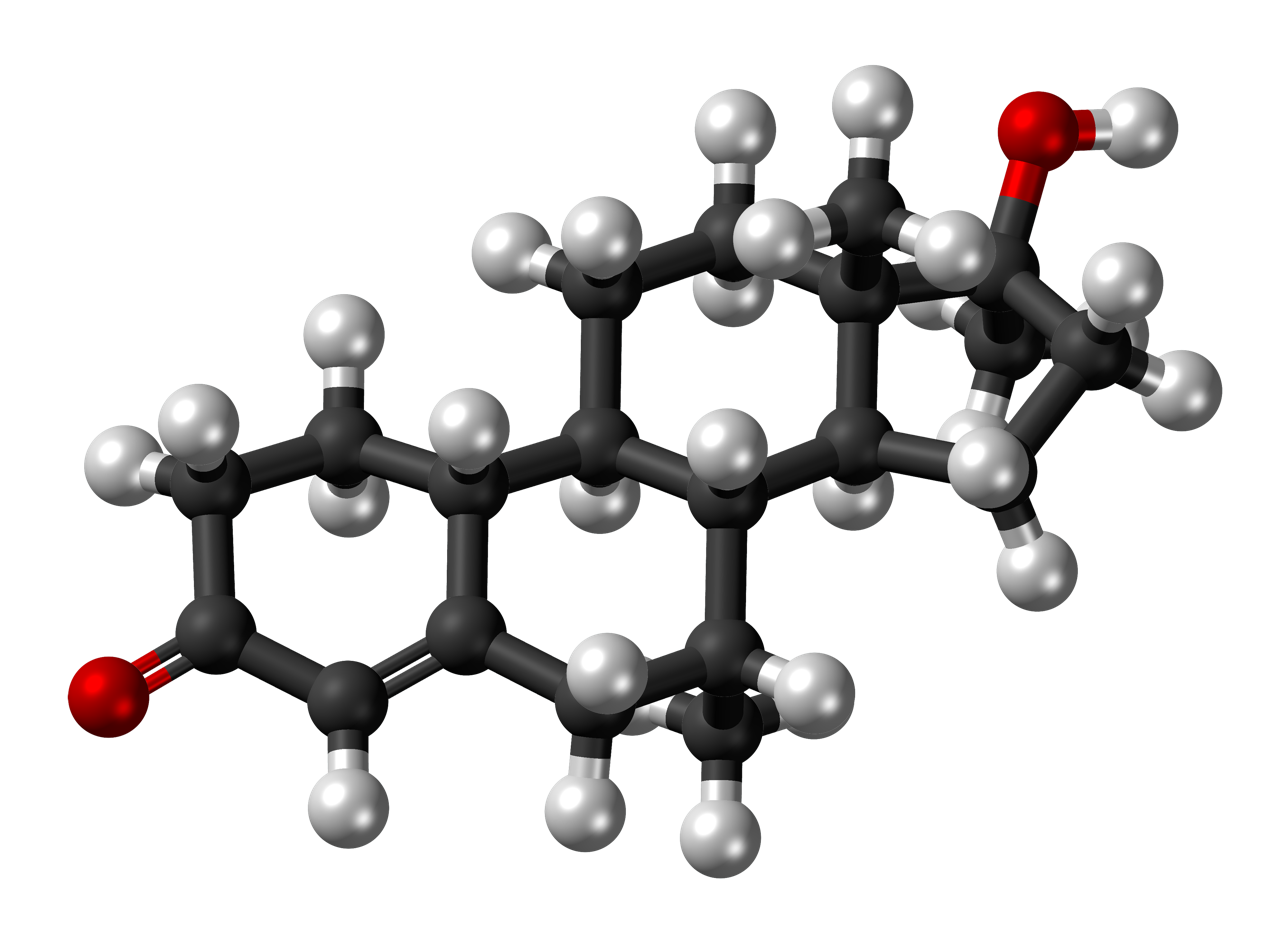

Clinical data
- Trade names: Cheque Drops, Matenon
- Other names: U-10997; CDB-904; Dimethylnandrolone; Dimethylnortestosterone; DMNT; 7α,17α-Dimethyl-19-nortestosterone; 7α,17α-Dimethylestr-4-en-17β-ol-3-one
- AHFS/Drugs.com: International Drug Names
- Routes of administration: By mouth
- Drug class: Androgen; Anabolic steroid; Progestogen
- ATC code: None

Legal status
- Legal status: BR: Class C5 (Anabolic steroids); CA: Schedule IV; US: Schedule III

Pharmacokinetic data
- Metabolism: Liver

Identifiers
- IUPAC name: (7R,8R,9S,10R,13S,14S,17S)-17-hydroxy-7,13,17-trimethyl-1,2,6,7,8,9,10,11,12,14,15,16-dodecahydrocyclopenta[a]phenanthren-3-one
- CAS Number: 3704-09-4
- PubChem CID: 251636
- IUPHAR/BPS: 2859
- ChemSpider: 220460
- UNII: 9OGY4BOR8D
- KEGG: D05025
- ChEBI: CHEBI:34849
- ChEMBL: ChEMBL425863
- CompTox Dashboard (EPA): DTXSID4036489
- ECHA InfoCard: 100.020.951

Chemical and physical data
- Formula: C_{20}H_{30}O_{2}
- Molar mass: 302.458 g·mol^{−1}
- 3D model (JSmol): Interactive image
- SMILES: C[C@@H]1CC2=CC(=O)CC[C@@H]2[C@@H]3[C@@H]1[C@@H]4CC[C@]([C@]4(CC3)C)(C)O
- InChI: InChI=1S/C20H30O2/c1-12-10-13-11-14(21)4-5-15(13)16-6-8-19(2)17(18(12)16)7-9-20(19,3)22/h11-12,15-18,22H,4-10H2,1-3H3/t12-,15+,16-,17+,18-,19+,20+/m1/s1; Key:PTQMMNYJKCSPET-OMHQDGTGSA-N

Mibolerone, also known as dimethylnortestosterone (DMNT) and sold under the brand names Cheque Drops and Matenon, is a synthetic, orally active, and extremely potent anabolic–androgenic steroid (AAS) and a 17α-alkylated nandrolone (19-nortestosterone) derivative which was marketed by Upjohn for use as a veterinary drug. It was indicated specifically as an oral treatment for prevention of estrus (heat) in adult female dogs.

== Pharmacology ==
=== Pharmacodynamics ===
Mibolerone has both higher affinity and greater selectivity for the androgen receptor (AR) than does the related potent AAS metribolone (17α-methyl-19-nor-δ^{9,11}-testosterone), although potent and significant progestogenic activity remains present. However, another study found that mibolerone and metribolone had similar affinity for the progesterone receptor (PR) but that mibolerone only had around half the affinity of metribolone for the AR.

Relative affinities (%) of mibolerone and related steroids
Compound	Chemical name	PR	AR	ER	GR	MR
Testosterone	T	1.0	100	<0.1	0.17	0.9
Nandrolone	19-NT	20	154	<0.1	0.5	1.6
Trenbolone	∆^{9,11}-19-NT	74	197	<0.1	2.9	1.33
Trestolone	7α-Me-19-NT	50–75	100–125	?	<1	?
Normethandrone	17α-Me-19-NT	100	146	<0.1	1.5	0.6
Metribolone	∆^{9,11}-17α-Me-19-NT	208	204	<0.1	26	18
Mibolerone	7α,17α-DiMe-19-NT	214	108	<0.1	1.4	2.1
Dimethyltrienolone	∆^{9,11}-7α,17α-DiMe-19-NT	306	180	0.1	22	52
Values are percentages (%). Reference ligands (100%) were progesterone for the PR, testosterone for the AR, estradiol for the ER, DEXA for the GR, and aldosterone for the MR.

== Chemistry ==
Mibolerone, also known as 7α,17α-dimethyl-19-nortestosterone (DMNT) or as 7α,17α-dimethylestr-4-en-17β-ol-3-one, is a synthetic estrane steroid and a 17α-alkylated derivative of nandrolone (19-nortestosterone). It is the 17α-methyl derivative of trestolone (7α-methyl-19-nortestosterone; MENT). Other related AAS include metribolone (17α-methyl-δ^{9,11}-19-nortestosterone) and dimethyltrienolone (7α,17α-dimethyl-δ^{9,11}-19-nortestosterone).

=== Synthesis ===
The original patented synthesis was revised: Precursor (also needed for Plomestane):

The reaction of Bolandione [734-32-7] (1) with triethyl orthoformate gave 3-Ethoxyestra-3,5-dien-17-one [2863-88-9] (2) in 64% yield. Organometallic reaction with methyl lithium followed by hydrolysis of the dienol ether gave Normethandrone [514-61-4] (5) in 40% yield. In an alternative synthesis, reaction of Estr-5(10)-ene-3,17-dione [3962-66-1] (3) with methanol catalyzed by malonic acid gave a near quantitivate yield of the ketal, 3,3-dimethoxyestr-5(10)-en-17-one [19257-34-2] (4). Reaction with the organometallic reagent and hydrolysis in this case afforded a much higher yield of product (86.7%) than in the first case. Oxidation with chloranil afforded a 75.6% yield of 17-methyl-6-dehydronandrolone (6). Conjugate addition of methyl lithium in the presence of cuprous iodide (c.f. Gillman reagent) gave a 72.5% yield of mibolerone (7).

Original patented method:

In the other synthesis heating nandrolone acetate [1425-10-1] (1) with chloranil gives 6-Dehydronandrolone Acetate [2590-41-2] (2), and reaction of that compound with methylmagnesium bromide in the presence of cuprous chloride gives (after saponification), Trestolone (7alpha-Methylnandrolone) [3764-87-2] (3). The alcohol at C17 is then oxidized to a ketone, Mentabolan [17000-78-1] (4). Enamines are commonly used to activate adjacent functions; they are also not infrequently used, as in this case, as protecting groups. Thus, reaction of the intermediate with pyrrolidine gives dienamine PC135056261 (5). This transformation emphasizes the clear difference in reactivity between ketones at C7 and C17. A second methyl Grignard addition gives the corresponding 17α-methyl derivative. Hydrolysis of the enamine function then affords mibolerone (6).

For SAR purposes compare for bolasterone and calusterone.

== History ==
Mibolerone was first synthesized in 1963.

== Society and culture ==
=== Generic names ===
Mibolerone is the generic name of the drug and its INN, USAN, and BAN. It is also known as dimethylnortestosterone (DMNT) and by its former developmental code name U-10997.

=== Brand names ===
Mibolerone has been marketed under the brand names Cheque Drops and Matenon.
