= Metribolone =

Chemical compound

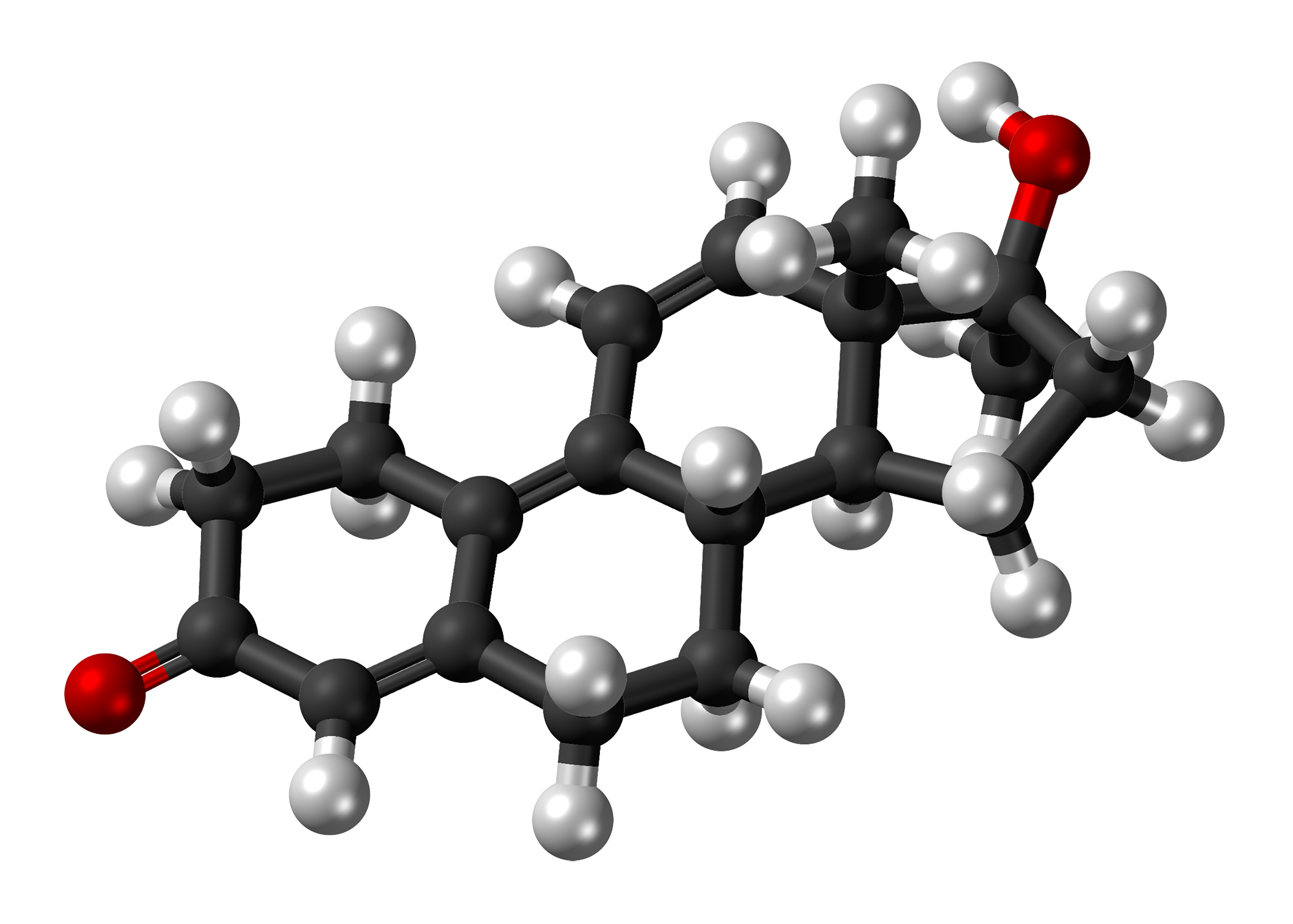

Clinical data
- Other names: Methyltrienolone, 17α-Methyltrenbolone; R1881; R-1881; RU-1881; NSC-92858; 17α-Methyl-19-nor-Δ^{9,11}-testosterone; 17α-Methylestra-4,9,11-trien-17β-ol-3-one
- Routes of administration: By mouth
- Drug class: Androgen; Anabolic steroid; Progestogen

Identifiers
- IUPAC name: (8S,13S,14S,17S)-17-Hydroxy-13,17-dimethyl-1,2,6,7,8,14,15,16-octahydrocyclopenta[a]phenanthren-3-one
- CAS Number: 965-93-5
- PubChem CID: 261000
- IUPHAR/BPS: 2857
- ChemSpider: 229099
- UNII: 2C323EGI97
- KEGG: C14257
- ChEBI: CHEBI:379896
- ChEMBL: ChEMBL166444
- CompTox Dashboard (EPA): DTXSID8034162
- ECHA InfoCard: 100.190.113

Chemical and physical data
- Formula: C_{19}H_{24}O_{2}
- Molar mass: 284.399 g·mol^{−1}
- 3D model (JSmol): Interactive image
- SMILES: C[C@@]1(CC[C@@H]2[C@@]1(C=CC3=C4CCC(=O)C=C4CC[C@@H]23)C)O
- InChI: InChI=1S/C19H24O2/c1-18-9-7-15-14-6-4-13(20)11-12(14)3-5-16(15)17(18)8-10-19(18,2)21/h7,9,11,16-17,21H,3-6,8,10H2,1-2H3/t16-,17+,18+,19+/m1/s1; Key:CCCIJQPRIXGQOE-XWSJACJDSA-N

Metribolone (developmental code R1881, also known as methyltrienolone) is a synthetic and orally active anabolic–androgenic steroid (AAS) and a 17α-alkylated nandrolone (19-nortestosterone) derivative which was never marketed for medical use but has been widely used in scientific research as a hot ligand in androgen receptor (AR) ligand binding assays (LBAs) and as a photoaffinity label for the AR. More precisely, metribolone is the 17α-methylated derivative of trenbolone. It was investigated briefly for the treatment of advanced breast cancer in women in the late 1960s and early 1970s, but was found to produce signs of severe hepatotoxicity at very low dosages, and its development was subsequently discontinued.

== Medical uses ==
Metribolone was never approved for medical use, a situation unlikely to change given its liver toxicity even at low doses. It was studied for the potential treatment of advanced breast cancer in women but development was abandoned.

== Side effects ==
Side effects of metribolone include virilization and hepatotoxicity among others.

== Pharmacology ==
=== Pharmacodynamics ===
Metribolone is an AAS, or an agonist of the AR, with both anabolic and androgenic activity. It is one of the most potent AAS to have ever been synthesized, with 120 to 300 times the oral anabolic potency and 60 to 70 times the androgenic potency of the reference AAS methyltestosterone in castrated male rats, although the same level of potency has not been observed in studies in humans. In addition to the AR, metribolone has high affinity for the progesterone receptor (PR), and binds to the glucocorticoid receptor (GR) as well. The drug was also identified in 2007 as a potent antimineralocorticoid, with similar affinity for the mineralocorticoid receptor as aldosterone and spironolactone. In addition, metribolone was identified in 2010 as a potent inhibitor of 3β-hydroxysteroid dehydrogenase (3β-HSD) 1 and 2 (IC_{50} = 0.02 and 0.16 μM, respectively). On the basis of this finding, it has been said that metribolone should be used very cautiously in scientific research, taking into account 3β-HSD inhibition to avoid erroneous interpretation.

Metribolone has a high potential for hepatotoxicity, similarly to other 17α-alkylated AAS. However, the hepatotoxic potential of metribolone appears to be exceptionally high, likely in relation to its very high potency and metabolic stability; in a study of treatment with the drug for advanced breast cancer, severe hepatic dysfunction was observed at very low dosages.

Relative affinities (%) of metribolone and related steroids
Compound	Chemical name	PR	AR	ER	GR	MR
Testosterone	T	1.0	100	<0.1	0.17	0.9
Nandrolone	19-NT	20	154	<0.1	0.5	1.6
Trenbolone	∆^{9,11}-19-NT	74	197	<0.1	2.9	1.33
Trestolone	7α-Me-19-NT	50–75	100–125	?	<1	?
Normethandrone	17α-Me-19-NT	100	146	<0.1	1.5	0.6
Metribolone	∆^{9,11}-17α-Me-19-NT	208	204	<0.1	26	18
Mibolerone	7α,17α-DiMe-19-NT	214	108	<0.1	1.4	2.1
Dimethyltrienolone	∆^{9,11}-7α,17α-DiMe-19-NT	306	180	0.1	22	52
Notes: Values are percentages (%). Reference ligands (100%) were progesterone for the PR, testosterone for the AR, estradiol for the ER, DEXA for the GR, and aldosterone for the MR. Sources:

Relative affinities of nandrolone and related steroids at the androgen receptor
Compound	rAR (%)	hAR (%)
Testosterone	38	38
5α-Dihydrotestosterone	77	100
Nandrolone	75	92
5α-Dihydronandrolone	35	50
Ethylestrenol	ND	2
Norethandrolone	ND	22
5α-Dihydronorethandrolone	ND	14
Metribolone	100	110
Sources: See template.

=== Pharmacokinetics ===
Metribolone has very low affinity for human serum sex hormone-binding globulin (SHBG), less than 5% of that of testosterone and less than 1% of that of dihydrotestosterone (DHT).

== Chemistry ==
Metribolone, also known as 17α-methyltrenbolone, as well as 17α-methyl-δ^{9,11}-19-nortestosterone or 17α-methylestra-4,9,11-trien-17β-ol-3-one, is a synthetic estrane steroid and a 17α-alkylated derivative of nandrolone (19-nortestosterone). It is the C17α methylated derivative of trenbolone (δ^{9,11}-19-nortestosterone) and the C9- and C11-dehydrogenated (δ^{9,11}) analogue of normethandrone (17α-methyl-19-nortestosterone). Other close relatives and derivatives of metribolone include mibolerone (7α,17α-dimethyl-19-nortestosterone) and dimethyltrienolone (RU-2420; 7α,17α-dimethyl-δ^{9,11}-19-nortestosterone). In addition to AAS, trimethyltrienolone (R2956; 2α,2β,17α-trimethyl-δ^{9,11}-19-nortestosterone), a highly potent antiandrogen, has been derived from metribolone.

== History ==
Metribolone was first described in the literature in 1965. It was studied clinically in the late 1960s and early 1970s, most notably in the treatment of advanced breast cancer. The drug was found to be effective and showed weak androgenicity, but also produced severe signs of hepatotoxicity, and was ultimately never marketed. By the mid-1970s, metribolone was becoming an accepted standard as a ligand and agonist of the AR in scientific research. It remains in wide use for this purpose today. Aside from scientific research, metribolone has also been encountered as an AAS in non-medical contexts, for instance in doping in sports and bodybuilding.

== Society and culture ==
=== Generic names ===
Metribolone is the generic name of metribolone and its INN. It is also known by the name methyltrienolone and its developmental code names R1881, R-1881, RU-1881, and RU1881, and is very commonly referred to by these other names rather than as metribolone in the scientific literature.

=== Doping in sports ===
Prior to the 2008 Beijing Olympic Games, 11 members of the Greek national weightlifting team and 4 Greek track and field athletes tested positive for metribolone.
