= Trestolone =

Chemical compound

Clinical data
- Other names: MENT; MENTR; RU-27333; 7α-Methylnandrolone; 7α-Methyl-19-nortestosterone; 7α-Methylestr-4-en-17β-ol-3-one
- Routes of administration: Subcutaneous implant, intramuscular injection (as trestolone acetate)
- Drug class: Androgen; Anabolic steroid; Progestogen; Antigonadotropin
- ATC code: None

Identifiers
- IUPAC name: (7R,8R,9S,10R,13S,14S,17S)-17-hydroxy-7,13-dimethyl-2,6,7,8,9,10,11,12,14,15,16,17-dodecahydro-1H-cyclopenta[a]phenanthren-3-one
- CAS Number: 3764-87-2
- PubChem CID: 9838899
- DrugBank: DB05830
- ChemSpider: 8014619
- UNII: 40P3287I94
- CompTox Dashboard (EPA): DTXSID20863270
- ECHA InfoCard: 100.184.887

Chemical and physical data
- Formula: C_{19}H_{28}O_{2}
- Molar mass: 288.431 g·mol^{−1}
- 3D model (JSmol): Interactive image
- SMILES: O=C4\C=C2/[C@@H]([C@H]1CC[C@@]3([C@@H](O)CC[C@H]3[C@@H]1[C@H](C)C2)C)CC4
- InChI: InChI=1S/C19H28O2/c1-11-9-12-10-13(20)3-4-14(12)15-7-8-19(2)16(18(11)15)5-6-17(19)21/h10-11,14-18,21H,3-9H2,1-2H3/t11-,14+,15-,16+,17+,18-,19+/m1/s1; Key:YSGQGNQWBLYHPE-CFUSNLFHSA-N

Trestolone, also known as 7α-methyl-19-nortestosterone (MENT), is an experimental androgen/anabolic steroid (AAS) and progestogen medication which has been under development for potential use as a form of hormonal birth control for men and in androgen replacement therapy for low testosterone levels in men but has never been marketed for medical use. It is given as an implant that is placed into fat. As trestolone acetate, an androgen ester and prodrug of trestolone, the medication can also be given by injection into muscle.

Side effects Trestolone is an AAS, and hence is an agonist of the androgen receptor, the biological target of androgens like testosterone. It is also a progestin, or a synthetic progestogen, and hence is an agonist of the progesterone receptor, the biological target of progestogens like progesterone. Due to its androgenic and progestogenic activity, trestolone has antigonadotropic effects. These effects result in reversible suppression of sperm production and are responsible for the contraceptive effects of trestolone in men.

Trestolone was first described in 1963. Subsequently, it was not studied again until 1990. Development of trestolone for potential clinical use started by 1993 and continued thereafter. No additional development appears to have been conducted since 2013. The medication was developed by the Population Council, a non-profit, non-governmental organization dedicated to reproductive health.

== Medical uses ==
Trestolone is an experimental medication and is not currently approved for medical use. It has been under development for potential use as a male hormonal contraceptive and in androgen replacement therapy for low testosterone levels. The medication has been studied and developed for use as a subcutaneous implant. An androgen ester and prodrug of trestolone, trestolone acetate, has also been developed, for use via intramuscular injection.

== Side effects ==
Trestolone may cause sexual dysfunction (e.g., decreased sex drive, reduced erectile function) and decreased bone mineral density due to estrogen deficiency.

== Pharmacology ==
=== Pharmacodynamics ===
As an AAS, trestolone is an agonist of the androgen receptor (AR), similarly to androgens like testosterone and dihydrotestosterone (DHT). Trestolone is not a substrate for 5α-reductase and hence is not potentiated or inactivated in so-called "androgenic" tissues like the skin, hair follicles, and prostate gland. As such, it has a high ratio of anabolic to androgenic activity, similarly to other nandrolone derivatives. Trestolone is a substrate for aromatase and hence produces the estrogen 7α-methylestradiol as a metabolite. However, trestolone has only weak estrogenic activity and an amount that would appear to be insufficient for replacement purposes, as evidenced by decreased bone mineral density in men treated with it for hypogonadism. Trestolone also has potent progestogenic activity. Both the androgenic and progestogenic activity of trestolone are thought to be involved in its antigonadotropic activity.

Relative affinities (%) of trestolone and related steroids
Compound	PR	AR	ER	GR	MR	SHBG	CBG
Nandrolone	20	154–155	<0.1	0.5	1.6	1	?
Trestolone	50–75	100–125	?	<1	?	?	?
7α-Methylestradiol	1–3	15–25	101	<1	<1	?	?
Values are percentages (%). Reference ligands (100%) were progesterone for the PR, testosterone for the AR, E2 for the ER, DEXA for the GR, aldosterone for the MR, DHT for SHBG, and cortisol for CBG.

==== Mechanism of action ====
Spermatozoa are produced in the testes of males in a process called spermatogenesis. In order to render a man infertile, a hormone-based male contraceptive method must stop spermatogenesis by interrupting the release of gonadotropins from the pituitary gland. Even in low concentrations, trestolone is a potent inhibitor of the release of the gonadotropins, luteinizing hormone (LH) and follicle stimulating hormone (FSH). In order for spermatogenesis to occur in the testes, both FSH and testosterone must be present. By inhibiting release of FSH, trestolone creates an endocrine environment in which conditions for spermatogenesis are not ideal. Manufacture of sperm is further impaired by the suppression of LH, which in turn drastically curtails the production of testosterone. Sufficient regular doses of trestolone cause severe oligozoospermia or azoospermia, and therefore infertility, in most men. Trestolone-induced infertility has been found to be quickly reversible upon discontinuation.

When LH release is inhibited, the amount of testosterone made in the testes declines dramatically. As a result of trestolone's gonadotropin-suppressing qualities, levels of serum testosterone fall sharply in men treated with sufficient amounts of the medication. Testosterone is the main hormone responsible for maintenance of male secondary sex characteristics. Normally, an inadequate testosterone level causes undesirable effects such as fatigue, loss of skeletal muscle mass, reduced libido, and weight gain. However, the androgenic and anabolic properties of trestolone largely ameliorate this problem — essentially, trestolone replaces testosterone's role as the primary male hormone in the body.

=== Pharmacokinetics ===
The pharmacokinetic properties of trestolone, such as poor oral bioavailability and short elimination half-life, make it unsuitable for oral administration or long-term intramuscular injection. As such, trestolone must be administered parenterally via a different and more practical route such as subcutaneous implant, transdermal patch, or topical gel. Trestolone acetate, a prodrug of trestolone, can be administered via intramuscular injection.

== Chemistry ==
Trestolone, also known as 7α-methyl-19-nortestosterone (MENT) or as 7α-methylestr-4-en-17β-ol-3-one, is a synthetic estrane steroid and a derivative of nandrolone (19-nortestosterone). It is a modification of nandrolone with a methyl group at the C7α position. Closely related AAS include 7α-methyl-19-norandrostenedione (MENT dione, trestione) (an androgen prohormone of trestolone) and dimethandrolone (7α,11β-dimethyl-19-nortestosterone) (the C11β methylated derivative of trestolone), as well as mibolerone (7α,17α-dimethyl-19-nortestosterone) and dimethyltrienolone (7α,17α-dimethyl-δ^{9,11}-19-nortestosterone). The progestin tibolone (7α-methyl-17α-ethynyl-δ^{5(10)}-19-nortestosterone) is also closely related to trestolone.

=== Synthesis & Applications ===
The chemical synthesis of trestolone is reported:

Trestolone is an intermediate used in the synthesis of mibolerone, tibolone & isotibolone. If it is oxidized to mentabolan, this in-turn can be used to synthesize almestrone, a compound with manifold steroid synthesis applications.

== History ==
Trestolone was first described in 1963. However, it was not subsequently studied again until 1990. Development of trestolone for potential use in male hormonal contraception and androgen replacement therapy was started by 1993, and continued thereafter. No additional development appears to have been conducted since 2013. Trestolone was developed by the Population Council, a non-profit, non-governmental organization dedicated to reproductive health.

== Society and culture ==
=== Generic names ===
Trestolone is the generic name of the drug and its INN. It is also commonly known as 7α-methyl-19-nortestosterone (MENT).
