= Dienolone =

Chemical compound

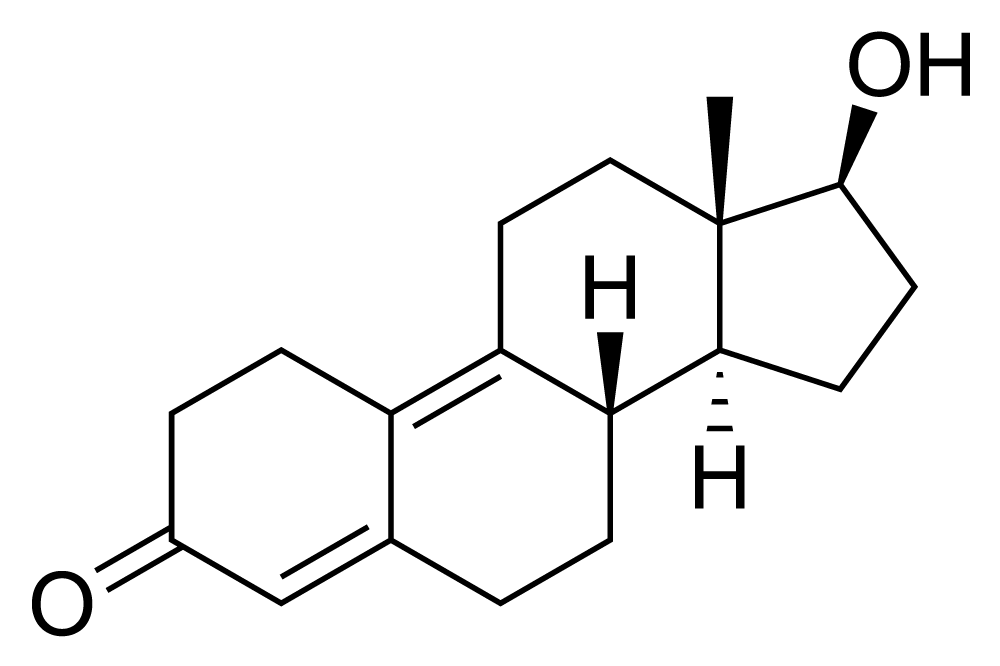

Clinical data
- Other names: RU-3118; Nordienolone, Dehydronandrolone.
- ATC code: None

Identifiers
- IUPAC name: (8S,13S,14S,17S)-17-hydroxy-13-methyl-2,6,7,8,11,12,14,15,16,17-decahydro-1H-cyclopenta[a]phenanthren-3-one
- CAS Number: 6218-29-7
- PubChem CID: 11747706
- ChemSpider: 9922410
- UNII: ZX4VV1AKUF
- ChEMBL: ChEMBL2311179
- CompTox Dashboard (EPA): DTXSID80471835
- ECHA InfoCard: 100.125.823

Chemical and physical data
- Formula: C_{18}H_{24}O_{2}
- Molar mass: 272.388 g·mol^{−1}
- 3D model (JSmol): Interactive image
- SMILES: CC12CCC3=C4CCC(=O)C=C4CCC3C1CCC2O
- InChI: InChI=1S/C18H24O2/c1-18-9-8-14-13-5-3-12(19)10-11(13)2-4-15(14)16(18)6-7-17(18)20/h10,15-17,20H,2-9H2,1H3/t15-,16+,17+,18+/m1/s1; Key:PUQSDJZESAQGQS-OWSLCNJRSA-N

Dienolone (developmental code name RU-3118; online product names Trenazone, Dienazone), or nordienolone, also known as 19-nor-δ^{9(10)}-testosterone, δ^{9(10)}-nandrolone, or estra-4,9(10)-dien-17β-ol-3-one, is a synthetic anabolic-androgenic steroid (AAS) of the 19-nortestosterone group that was never marketed. It has been found to possess slightly lower affinity for the androgen receptor (AR) and progesterone receptor (PR) relative to nandrolone in rat and rabbit tissue bioassays, whereas trenbolone was found to possess the same affinity for the AR as dienolone but several-fold increased affinity for the PR. Dienedione (the 17-keto analogue of dienolone, also known as 19-nor-4,9-androstadienedione) is thought to be a prohormone of dienolone, while methyldienolone and ethyldienolone are orally active 17α-alkylated AAS derivatives of dienolone. In contrast, dienogest, the 17α-cyanomethyl derivative of dienolone, is a potent progestogen and antiandrogen.

== Chemistry ==
=== Synthesis ===
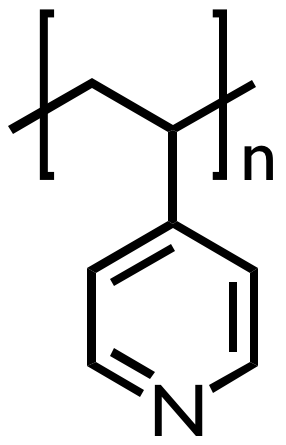
Polyvinylpyridine

Prenortestosterone [1089-78-7] (see under nandrolone synthesis) can be brominated. 2x dehydrohalogenation step then leads to dienolone. In the old method a mixture of molecular bromine and pyridine had been used as the reagents. However, in the new and improved synthesis the reagent was changed to poly(vinylpyridine) bromide perbromide (P(4-VPBPB)) [91650-35-0], polyvinyl(pyridine) (PVP or P4VP) [25232-41-1] and pyridine. This gives an improved yield of product

=== Application ===
Whilst Dienedione can be used as a precursor to trenbolone, it is also fully possible to employ Dienolone (Dehydronandrolone), as was recently claimed.

The synthesis of 11β-methyl-19-nortestosterone is an additional use of dienolone.

== See also ==
- Trenbolone (trienolone)
