= 17α-Alkylated anabolic steroid =

Class of chemical compounds

A 17α-alkylated anabolic steroid is a synthetic anabolic–androgenic steroid (AAS) that features an alkyl group, specifically a methyl or ethyl group, at the C17α position. Unlike many other AAS, 17α-alkylated AAS are orally active and do not require intramuscular injection. However, they uniquely possess a high potential for hepatotoxicity, which simultaneously limits their use. In addition, some have a high risk of gynecomastia due to uniquely high estrogenic activity, although this does not apply to 17α-alkylated AAS that are also 4,5α-reduced or 19-demethylated (i.e., that are also dihydrotestosterone (DHT) or nandrolone derivatives, respectively). The prototypical example of a 17α-alkylated AAS is methyltestosterone (17α-methyltestosterone).

== Structure-activity relationships ==
Extension of the C17α alkyl chain longer than an ethyl group abolishes androgenic activity and converts the drug into an antiandrogen, as in topterone (17α-propyltestosterone) and allylestrenol (17α-allyl-3-deketo-19-nortestosterone) (an extended-chain variant of ethylestrenol). Conversely, replacement of the C17α alkyl group with an ethynyl group greatly reduces but does not abolish androgenic activity, as in ethisterone (17α-ethynyltestosterone) and norethisterone (17α-ethynyl-19-nortestosterone). Similarly to extension of the C17α alkyl chain, extension of the C17α ethynyl chain abolishes androgenic activity, as with dimethisterone (6α,21-dimethylethisterone). Dienogest, which is antiandrogenic, features extension of the C17α chain in the form of a cyanomethyl group at the C17α position.

== List of 17α-alkylated AAS ==
Testosterone derivatives

- Marketed
  - Bolasterone
  - Calusterone
  - Chlorodehydromethyltestosterone (CDMT)
  - Fluoxymesterone
  - Formebolone
  - Metandienone (methandrostenolone)
  - Methandriol (methylandrostenediol)
  - Methyltestosterone
  - Oxymesterone
  - Penmesterol (penmestrol)
  - Tiomesterone
- Never marketed
  - Chlorodehydromethylandrostenediol (CDMA)
  - Chloromethylandrostenediol (CMA)
  - Enestebol
  - Ethyltestosterone
  - Hydroxystenozole
  - Methylclostebol (chloromethyltestosterone)

Dihydrotestosterone derivatives

- Marketed
  - Androisoxazole
  - Furazabol
  - Mebolazine (dimethazine, dymethazine)
  - Mestanolone (methylandrostanolone)
  - Oxandrolone
  - Oxymetholone
  - Stanozolol
- Never marketed
  - Desoxymethyltestosterone (DMT)
  - Methasterone (methyldrostanolone)
  - Methyl-1-testosterone (methyl-δ^{1}-DHT)
  - Methylepitiostanol
  - Methylstenbolone

Nandrolone (19-nortestosterone) derivatives

- Marketed
  - Ethylestrenol (ethylnandrol)
  - Mibolerone
  - Norethandrolone (ethylnandrolone, ethylestrenolone)
  - Normethandrone (methylestrenolone, normethisterone)
  - Propetandrol (propethandrol)
- Never marketed
  - Bolenol (ethylnorandrostenol)
  - Dimethyltrienolone
  - Ethyldienolone
  - Methyldienolone
  - Methylhydroxynandrolone
  - Metribolone (methyltrienolone)
  - Norboletone (norbolethone)
  - Tetrahydrogestrinone (THG)

== See also ==
- List of androgens/anabolic steroids
