= Altrenogest =

Chemical compound

Clinical data
- Trade names: Regumate, Matrix
- Other names: Allyltrenbolone; Allyltrienolone; RU-2267; RH-2267; A-35957; A-41300; 17α-Allylestra-4,9,11-trien-17β-ol-3-one; 17α-Allyl-19-nor-δ^{9,11}-testosterone
- Routes of administration: By mouth
- Drug class: Progestogen; Progestin
- ATCvet code: QG03DX90 (WHO)

Legal status
- Legal status: CA: ℞-only

Identifiers
- IUPAC name: (8S,13S,14S,17R)-17-Hydroxy-13-methyl-17-prop-2-enyl-1,2,6,7,8,14,15,16-octahydrocyclopenta[a]phenanthren-3-one
- CAS Number: 850-52-2
- PubChem CID: 10041070
- ChemSpider: 8216634
- UNII: 2U0X0JA2NB
- KEGG: D02840
- ChEMBL: ChEMBL1315492
- CompTox Dashboard (EPA): DTXSID3048863
- ECHA InfoCard: 100.011.549

Chemical and physical data
- Formula: C_{21}H_{26}O_{2}
- Molar mass: 310.437 g·mol^{−1}
- 3D model (JSmol): Interactive image
- SMILES: C[C@]12C=CC3=C4CCC(=O)C=C4CC[C@H]3[C@@H]1CC[C@]2(CC=C)O
- InChI: InChI=1S/C21H26O2/c1-3-10-21(23)12-9-19-18-6-4-14-13-15(22)5-7-16(14)17(18)8-11-20(19,21)2/h3,8,11,13,18-19,23H,1,4-7,9-10,12H2,2H3/t18-,19+,20+,21+/m1/s1; Key:VWAUPFMBXBWEQY-ANULTFPQSA-N

Altrenogest, sold under the brand names Swinemate and Altren manufactured by Aurora Pharmaceutical and Regumate manufactured by Merck, is a progestin of the 19-nortestosterone group which is widely used in veterinary medicine to suppress or synchronize estrus in horses and pigs. It is available for veterinary use in both Europe (as Regumate) and the United States (as Matrix).

== Uses ==
=== Veterinary ===
Altrenogest is used in veterinary medicine.

== Pharmacology ==
=== Pharmacodynamics ===
An in vitro yeast structure–activity relationships bioassay study found that altrenogest was the most potent agonist of both the progesterone receptor (PR) and the androgen receptor (AR) of a large selection of other progestogens as well as anabolic–androgenic steroids (AAS). The observed potency of altrenogest even exceeded that of metribolone (methyltrienolone, R-1881), which was the second most potent compound. In the study, it showed an EC_{50} of 0.64 nM for the AR and 688% of the relative activational potency of testosterone and an EC_{50} of 0.3 nM and 1,300% of the relative activational potency of progesterone, with an AR/PR activational potency ratio of 0.53.

Although very potent in both activities in vitro, the AR/PR activational potency ratio of altrenogest was in the same range as that of other 19-nortestosterone progestins such as norethisterone, noretynodrel, norgestrel, and allylestrenol (ratio for all < 1.0), whereas the AR/PR activational potency ratio of its 17α-deallylated AAS analogue trenbolone was, at 64, profoundly increased (although the ratio of metribolone (the 17α-methylated variant of altrenogest), at 0.56, was almost the same as that of altrenogest).

According to its manufacturer Roussel Uclaf, altrenogest has weak anabolic and androgenic activity equivalent to 1/20th of that of testosterone. However, no significant androgenic effects have been observed in young stallions or mature mares, and altrenogest has notably been used to maintain pregnancy in mares (similarly to the use of allylestrenol to maintain pregnancy in women) with no incidence of virilization or other abnormalities in filly offspring. On the other hand, minor potential anabolic/androgenic effects have been suggested for altrenogest in pigs.

== Chemistry ==
Altrenogest, also known as 17α-allyl-19-nor-δ^{9,11}-testosterone or as 17α-allylestra-4,9,11-trien-17β-ol-3-one, is a synthetic estrane steroid and derivative of 19-nortestosterone and 17α-allyltestosterone, or of 17α-allyl-19-nortestosterone. It is one of only two marketed progestins that possesses a 17α-allyl group, the other being allylestrenol. Most other progestins possess a 17α-ethynyl group, while AAS, if they are 17α-substituted, are usually 17α-alkylated (with a methyl or ethyl group). Altrenogest is the 17α-allylated derivative of the AAS trenbolone (and hence can also be referred to as allyltrenbolone or allyltrienolone), which itself is the 9,11-didehydro analogue of the AAS nandrolone (19-nortestosterone). Altrenogest is also closely related to norgestrienone.

=== Synthesis ===
The chemical synthesis has been described: Prior art: 20th century methods:

Dienedione is converted to its dimethylacetal to give 3,3-dimethoxyestra-5(10),9(11)-dien-17-one [10109-76-9] (1). Grignard reaction with allyl chloride [107-05-1] gives PC14988798 (2). Deprotection of the acetal using an aqueous solution of potassium bisulfate gives PC14988800 (3). Oxidation with 2,3-Dichloro-5,6-dicyano-1,4-benzoquinone [84-58-2] completed the synthesis of altrenogest (4).

== History ==
Altrenogest has been marketed as Regumate since the early 1980s.

== Society and culture ==
=== Generic names ===
Altrenogest is the generic name of the drug and its INN, USAN, and BAN, while altrénogest is its DCF.

=== Brand names ===
Altrenogest is marketed under the brand names Regumate and Matrix among others.
