= 17α-Allyl-19-nortestosterone =

Chemical compound

Clinical data
- Other names: Allylnortestosterone; Allylestrenolone; Allylnandrolone; 3-Ketoallylestrenol; 17α-Allylestr-4-en-17β-ol-3-one; Allylestrenolone
- Drug class: Progestogen

Identifiers
- IUPAC name: (8R,9S,10R,13S,14S,17R)-17-hydroxy-13-methyl-17-prop-2-enyl-1,2,6,7,8,9,10,11,12,14,15,16-dodecahydrocyclopenta[a]phenanthren-3-one
- CAS Number: 7358-46-5
- PubChem CID: 22790929
- ChemSpider: 22270
- UNII: EH9MJ5WS79

Chemical and physical data
- Formula: C_{21}H_{30}O_{2}
- Molar mass: 314.469 g·mol^{−1}
- 3D model (JSmol): Interactive image
- SMILES: C[C@]12CC[C@H]3[C@H]([C@@H]1CC[C@]2(CC=C)O)CCC4=CC(=O)CC[C@H]34
- InChI: InChI=1S/C21H30O2/c1-3-10-21(23)12-9-19-18-6-4-14-13-15(22)5-7-16(14)17(18)8-11-20(19,21)2/h3,13,16-19,23H,1,4-12H2,2H3/t16-,17+,18+,19-,20-,21-/m0/s1; Key:NXGWVXNWOIYZLE-XUDSTZEESA-N

17α-Allyl-19-nortestosterone, also known as 3-ketoallylestrenol or as 17α-allylestr-4-en-17β-ol-3-one, is a progestin which was never marketed. It is a combined derivative of the anabolic–androgenic steroid and progestogen nandrolone (19-nortestosterone) and the antiandrogen allyltestosterone (17α-allyltestosterone). The drug is a major active metabolite of allylestrenol, which is thought to be a prodrug of 17α-allyl-19-nortestosterone.

17α-Allyl-19-nortestosterone has 24% of the affinity of ORG-2058 and 186% of the affinity of progesterone for the progesterone receptor, 4.5% of the affinity of testosterone for the androgen receptor, 9.8% of the affinity of dexamethasone for the glucocorticoid receptor, 2.8% of the affinity of testosterone for sex hormone-binding globulin, and less than 0.2% of the affinity of estradiol for the estrogen receptor. The affinity of 17α-allyl-19-nortestosterone for the androgen receptor was less than that of norethisterone and medroxyprogesterone acetate and its affinity for sex hormone-binding globulin was much lower than that of norethisterone. These findings may help to explain the absence of teratogenic effects of allylestrenol on the external genitalia of female and male rat fetuses.

Relative affinities (%) of allylestrenol and metabolites
Compound	PR	AR	ER	GR	MR	SHBG	CBG
Allylestrenol	0	0	0	0	?	1	?
17α-Allyl-19-NT	186	5	0	10	?	3	?
Values are percentages (%). Reference ligands (100%) were P4 for the PR, T for the AR, E2 for the ER, DEXA for the GR, aldosterone for the MR, T for SHBG, and cortisol for CBG.

== See also ==
- Altrenogest
- Ethinyltestosterone
- Vinyltestosterone
