= Mebolazine =

Chemical compound

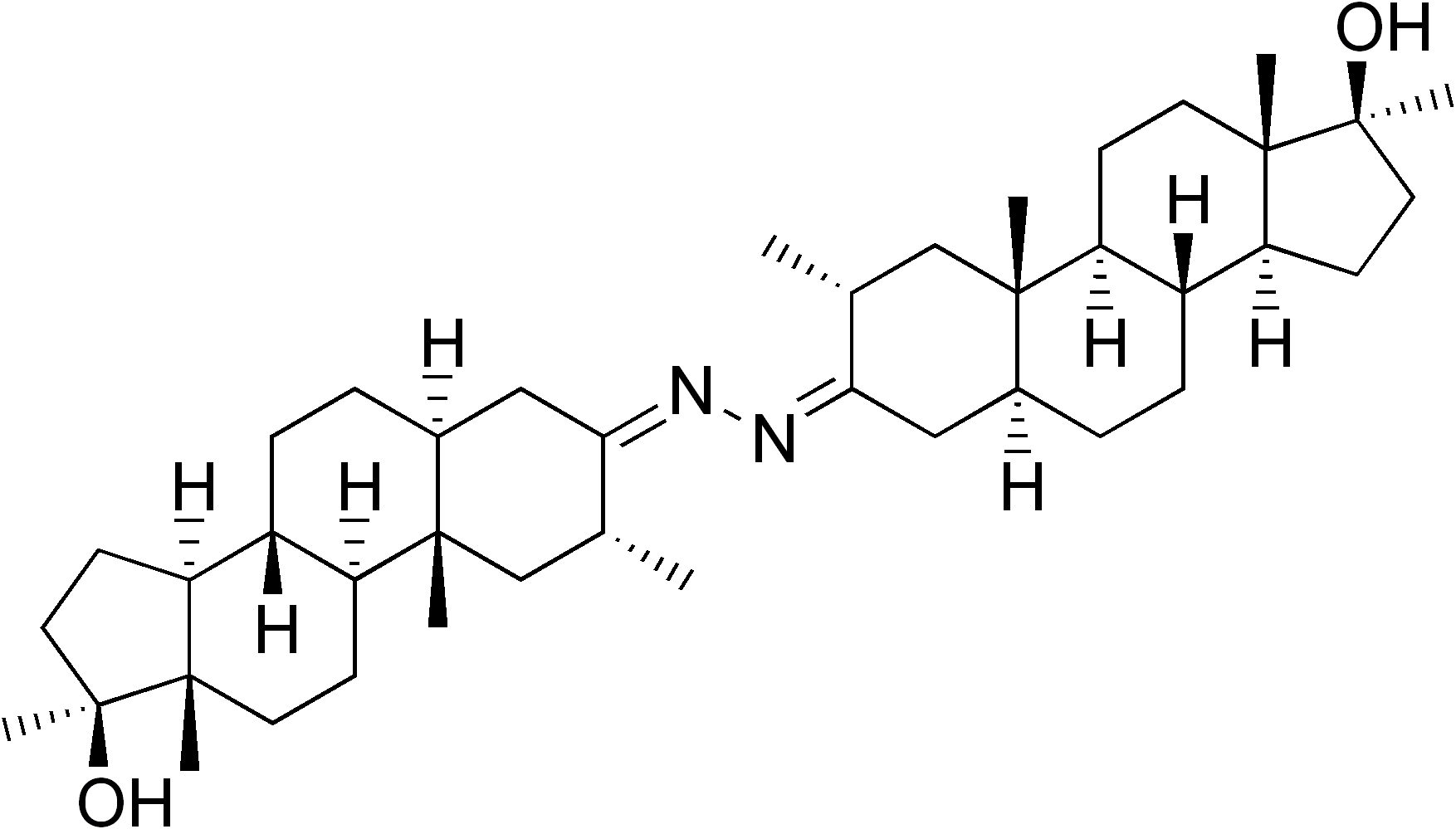

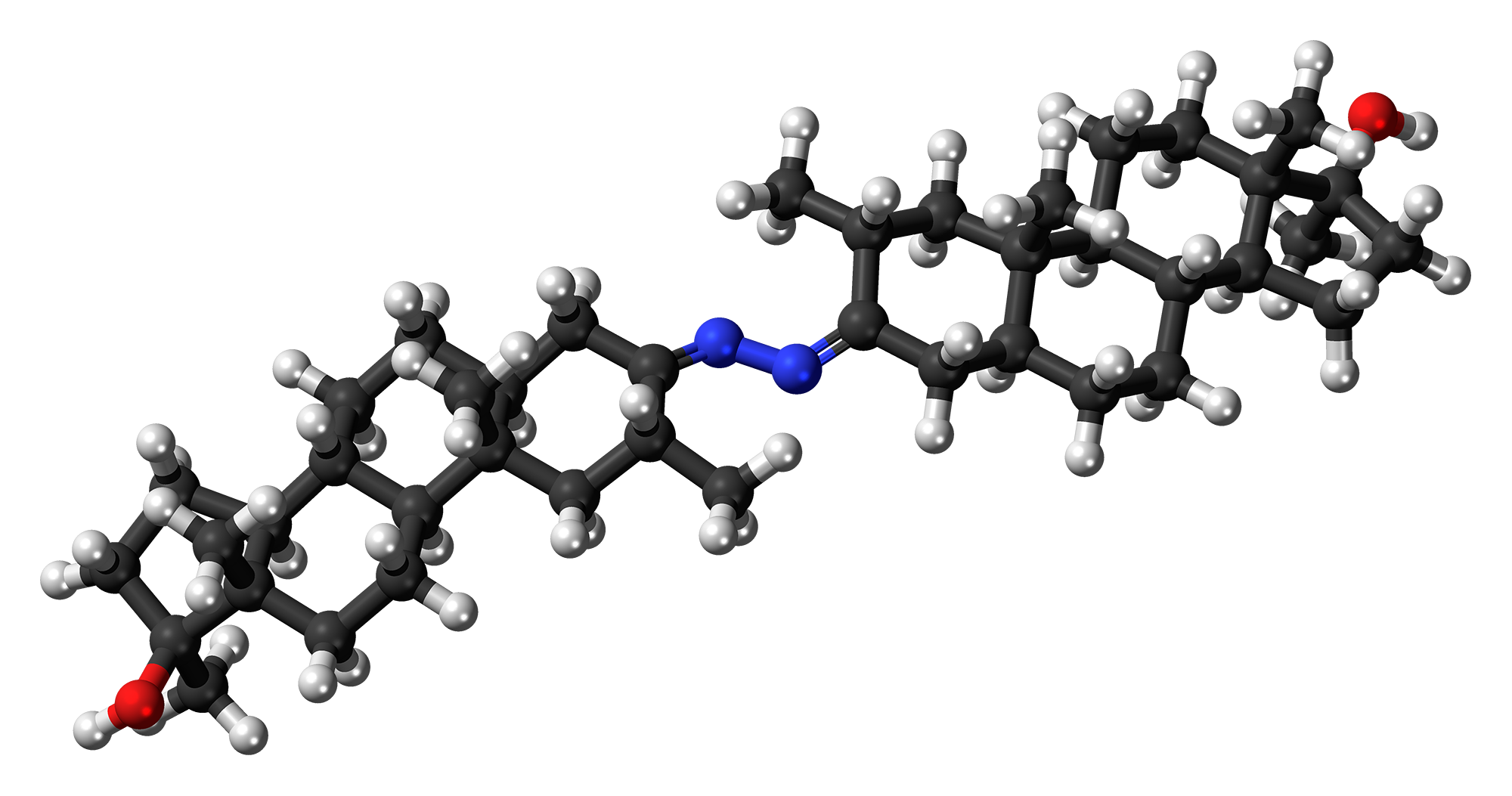

Clinical data
- Trade names: Dostalon, Roxilon
- Other names: Dimethazine; Dymethazine; Dimethasterone azine; Di(methasterone) azine; 2α,17α-Dimethyl-5α-androstan-17β-ol-3-one azine

Identifiers
- IUPAC name: (3Z)-3-[(Z)-(17-Hydroxy-2,10,13,17-tetramethyl-2,4,5,6,7,8,9,11,12,14,15,16-dodecahydro-1H-cyclopenta[a]phenanthren-3-ylidene)hydrazinylidene]-2,10,13,17-tetramethyl-2,4,5,6,7,8,9,11,12,14,15,16-dodecahydro-1H-cyclopenta[a]phenanthren-17-ol
- CAS Number: 3625-07-8
- PubChem CID: 9571069
- ChemSpider: 16736946
- UNII: 69C642I19V

Chemical and physical data
- Formula: C_{42}H_{68}N_{2}O_{2}
- Molar mass: 633.018 g·mol^{−1}
- 3D model (JSmol): Interactive image
- SMILES: C[C@@]23[C@](CC[C@]4([H])[C@@]([H])3CC[C@@]5(C)[C@]([H])4CC[C@@](C)5O)([H])C/C([C@H](C)C2)=N/N=C1[C@H](C)C[C@@]6(C)[C@](CC[C@]7([H])[C@@]([H])6CC[C@@]8(C)[C@]([H])7CC[C@@](C)8O)([H])C/1
- InChI: InChI=1S/C42H68N2O2/c1-25-23-37(3)27(9-11-29-31(37)13-17-39(5)33(29)15-19-41(39,7)45)21-35(25)43-44-36-22-28-10-12-30-32(38(28,4)24-26(36)2)14-18-40(6)34(30)16-20-42(40,8)46/h25-34,45-46H,9-24H2,1-8H3/b43-35-,44-36-/t25-,26-,27+,28+,29-,30-,31+,32+,33+,34+,37+,38+,39+,40+,41+,42+/m1/s1; Key:POPWFGNRCCUJGU-QQZDHCPGSA-N

Mebolazine (INN; brand names Dostalon and Roxilon; also known as dimethazine, dymethazine, di(methasterone) azine, or 2α,17α-dimethyl-5α-androstan-17β-ol-3-one azine) is a synthetic, orally active androgen/anabolic steroid (AAS) and a 17α-alkylated derivative of dihydrotestosterone (DHT) which is no longer marketed. It has a unique and unusual chemical structure, being a dimer of methasterone linked at the 3-position of the A-ring by an azine group, and reportedly acts as a prodrug of methasterone.

Since 2008, mebolazine has been used illegally as an ingredient is some dietary supplements, including vitamin B supplements, and in the United States the Food and Drug Administration has taken legal action against such manufacturers.

== See also ==
- Bolazine
