= C18H22O2 =

The molecular formula C_{18}H_{22}O_{2} may refer to:

- 17α-Dihydroequilin
- 17β-Dihydroequilin
- 8,9-Dehydroestradiol
- Dienedione
- Estrone, a hormone
- Hexestrol, an estrogen
- Trenbolone, a veterinary steroid drug
