= Methasterone =

Chemical compound

Clinical data
- Other names: Superdrol; Methyldrostanolone; Methasteron; 2α,17α-Dimethyl-4,5α-dihydrotestosterone; 2α,17α-Dimethyl-DHT; 2α,17α-Dimethyl-5α-androstan-17β-ol-3-one
- Routes of administration: oral
- Drug class: Androgen; Anabolic steroid
- ATC code: None

Legal status
- Legal status: US: Schedule III

Pharmacokinetic data
- Bioavailability: ≈50%
- Metabolism: Liver
- Elimination half-life: 8–12 hours
- Excretion: Urine

Identifiers
- IUPAC name: (2R,5S,8R,9S,10S,13S,14S,17S)-17-hydroxy-2,10,13,17-tetramethyl-2,4,5,6,7,8,9,11,12,14,15,16-dodecahydro-1H-cyclopenta[a]phenanthren-3-one
- CAS Number: 3381-88-2
- PubChem CID: 237186
- ChemSpider: 207079
- UNII: GH88DY98MR
- CompTox Dashboard (EPA): DTXSID10187472

Chemical and physical data
- Formula: C_{21}H_{34}O_{2}
- Molar mass: 318.501 g·mol^{−1}
- 3D model (JSmol): Interactive image
- SMILES: O=C2C[C@@H]1CC[C@@H]3[C@@H]([C@@]1(C)C[C@H]2C)CC[C@]4([C@H]3CC[C@@]4(O)C)C
- InChI: InChI=1S/C21H34O2/c1-13-12-19(2)14(11-18(13)22)5-6-15-16(19)7-9-20(3)17(15)8-10-21(20,4)23/h13-17,23H,5-12H2,1-4H3/t13-,14+,15-,16+,17+,19+,20+,21+/m1/s1; Key:QCWCXSMWLJFBNM-FOVYBZIDSA-N

Methasterone, also known as methyldrostanolone and known by the nickname Superdrol, is a synthetic and orally active anabolic–androgenic steroid (AAS) which was never marketed for medical use. It was sold legally for 9 years as a body building supplement. Because of this lengthy time being legal it has more studies and references than most other designer steroids.

== Medical uses ==
Methasterone was never a commercially available prescription drug. Its non-17α-alkylated counterpart, drostanolone propionate, was commercialized by Syntex Corporation under the brand name Masteron.

== Non-medical uses ==
Methasterone resurfaced in 2005 as a "designer steroid". It was brought to market by Designer Supplements as the primary ingredient of a dietary supplement named Superdrol. Its introduction into commerce may have represented an attempted circumvention of the U.S. Anabolic Steroids Control Act of 1990 (along with its 2004 revision), since the law is, in part, drug-specific; methasterone, as is the case with many designer steroids, was not declared a Schedule III class anabolic steroid in that act because it was not commercially available at the time the act, and its subsequent revision, were signed into law. Methasterone was therefore being sold as an over-the-counter dietary supplement.

== Side effects ==
Methasterone is hepatotoxic (toxic to the liver). Several cases of liver damage due to the use of methasterone have been cited in the medical literature.

== Chemistry ==
Methasterone, also known as 2α,17α-dimethyl-5α-dihydrotestosterone (2α,17α-dimethyl-DHT) or as 2α,17α-dimethyl-5α-androstan-17β-ol-3-one, is a synthetic androstane steroid and a 17α-alkylated derivative of DHT.

Mebolazine is formed by hydrazone formation between two equivalents of methasterone with one equivalent of hydrazine.

== History ==
The synthesis of methasterone is first mentioned in the literature in 1956 in connection with research conducted by Syntex Corporation in order to discover a compound with anti-tumor properties. In a 1959 research journal article, it is initially mentioned and is elaborated upon where its method of synthesis is discussed in greater detail, its tumor inhibiting properties are verified, and it is noted as being a "potent orally active anabolic agent exhibiting only weak androgenic activity." The results of subsequent assays to determine methasterone's anabolic and androgenic activity were published in Vida's Androgens and Anabolic Agents, a dated but still standard reference, where it was noted that methasterone possessed the oral bioavailability of methyltestosterone while being 400% as anabolic and 20% as androgenic, yielding a Q-ratio (anabolic to androgenic ratio) of 20, which is considered very high.

=== Designer steroid ===
It was in late 2005 that the reclassification of methasterone as AAS (as well as that of four other designer steroids) was brought to public awareness via an article published in the Washington Post. Don Catlin of the UCLA Olympic Laboratory, who conducted the studies, noted methasterone's similarity to drostanolone. A warning by the FDA was issued soon after to the general public as well as to the distributor, Designer Supplements LLC, for the marketing of this compound. Methasterone was subsequently added to the World Anti-Doping Agency (WADA) list of prohibited substances in sport. Despite all of this, methasterone has resurfaced within the supplement industry on several occasions since its banning by WADA.
