= Allyltestosterone =

Chemical compound

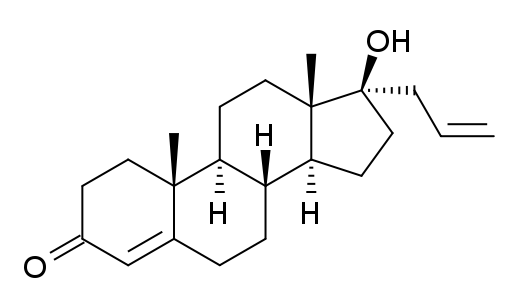

Clinical data
- Other names: 17α-Allyltestosterone; 17α-Allylandrost-4-en-17β-ol-3-one

Identifiers
- IUPAC name: (8R,9S,10R,13S,14S,17R)-17-hydroxy-10,13-dimethyl-17-prop-2-enyl-2,6,7,8,9,11,12,14,15,16-decahydro-1H-cyclopenta[a]phenanthren-3-one
- CAS Number: 98169-58-5
- PubChem CID: 22808244
- ChemSpider: 58190189
- UNII: 54HM6O0YGK
- CompTox Dashboard (EPA): DTXSID601047829

Chemical and physical data
- Formula: C_{22}H_{32}O_{2}
- Molar mass: 328.496 g·mol^{−1}
- 3D model (JSmol): Interactive image
- SMILES: C[C@]12CC[C@H]3[C@@H](CCC4=CC(=O)CC[C@]34C)[C@@H]1CC[C@]2(O)CC=C
- InChI: InChI=1S/C22H32O2/c1-4-10-22(24)13-9-19-17-6-5-15-14-16(23)7-11-20(15,2)18(17)8-12-21(19,22)3/h4,14,17-19,24H,1,5-13H2,2-3H3/t17-,18+,19+,20+,21+,22-/m1/s1; Key:DFRQHISHXQPKMU-VEYVBMQYSA-N

Allyltestosterone, or 17α-allyltestosterone, also known as 17α-allylandrost-4-en-17β-ol-3-one, is a steroid derived from testosterone that was first synthesized in 1936 and was never marketed. Along with propyltestosterone (topterone), it has been patented as a topical antiandrogen and hair growth inhibitor. Allyltestosterone is the parent structure of two marketed 19-nortestosterone progestins, allylestrenol and altrenogest. These progestins are unique among testosterone derivatives in that they appear to be associated with few or no androgenic effects.

== See also ==
- Steroidal antiandrogen
- List of steroidal antiandrogens
- Allylnortestosterone
- Ethinyltestosterone
- Vinyltestosterone
