= Bolazine capronate =

Chemical compound

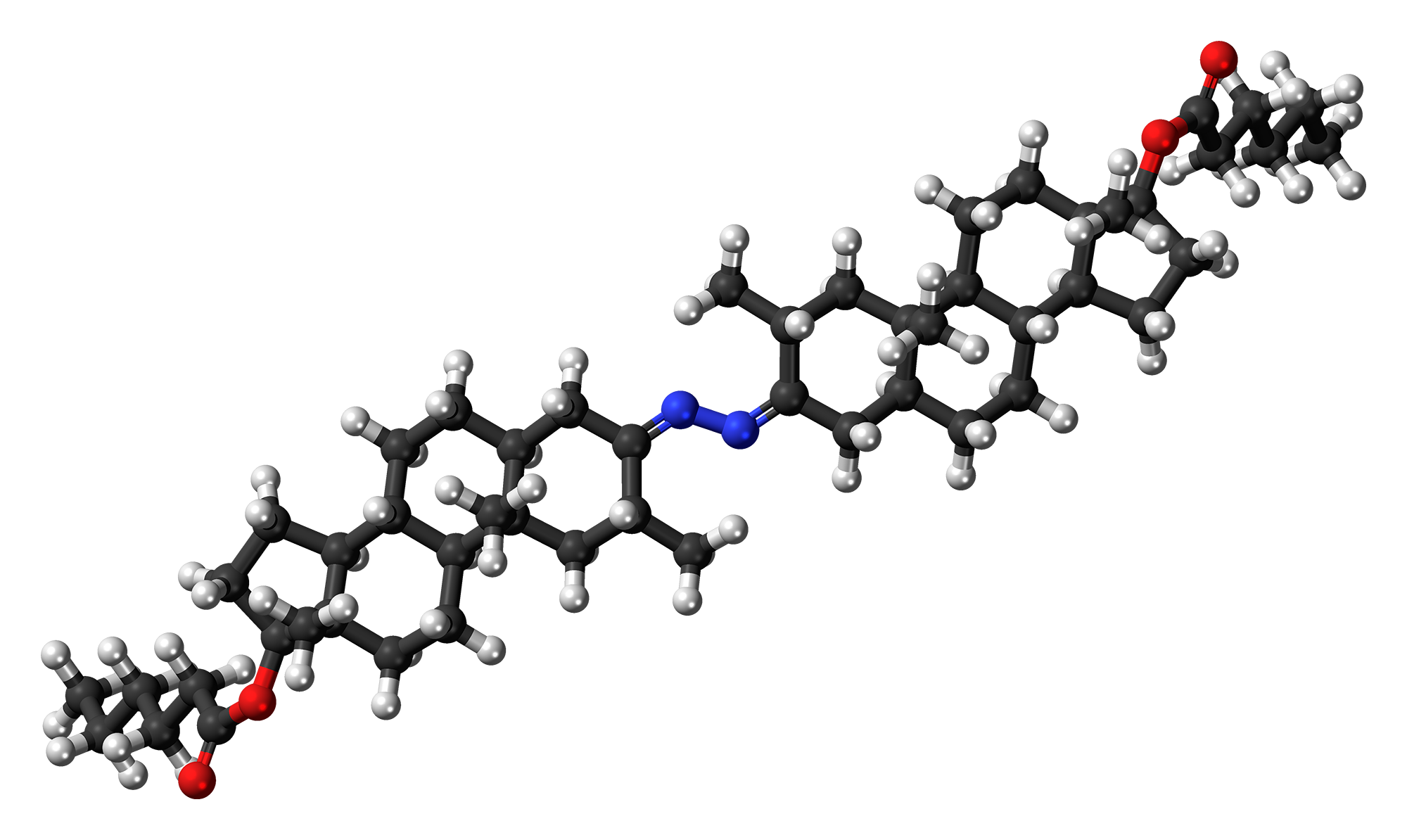

Clinical data
- Trade names: Roxilon Inject
- Other names: Bolazine caproate; Bolazine hexanoate; Di(drostanolone capronate) azine; 2α-Methyl-5α-androstan-17β-ol-3-one 17β-hexanoate azine
- Routes of administration: Intramuscular injection

Identifiers
- IUPAC name: (1S,2S,4R,5Z,7S,10R,11S,14S,15S)-5-{2-[(1S,2S,4R,5E,7S,10R,11S,14S,15S)-14-(hexanoyloxy)-2,4,15-trimethyltetracyclo[8.7.0.0^{2,7}.0^{11,15}]heptadecan-5-ylidene]hydrazin-1-ylidene}-2,4,15-trimethyltetracyclo[8.7.0.0^{2,7}.0^{11,15}]heptadecan-14-yl hexanoate
- ChemSpider: 8254591

Chemical and physical data
- Formula: C_{52}H_{84}N_{2}O_{4}
- Molar mass: 801.254 g·mol^{−1}
- 3D model (JSmol): Interactive image
- SMILES: CCCCCC(=O)O[C@H]1CC[C@H]2[C@@H]3CC[C@H]4C\C(=N\N=C5/C[C@@H]6CC[C@H]7[C@@H]8CC[C@H](OC(=O)CCCCC)[C@@]8(C)CC[C@@H]7[C@@]6(C)C[C@H]5C)[C@H](C)C[C@]4(C)[C@H]3CC[C@]12C
- InChI: InChI=1S/C52H84N2O4/c1-9-11-13-15-47(55)57-45-23-21-39-37-19-17-35-29-43(33(3)31-51(35,7)41(37)25-27-49(39,45)5)53-54-44-30-36-18-20-38-40-22-24-46(58-48(56)16-14-12-10-2)50(40,6)28-26-42(38)52(36,8)32-34(44)4/h33-42,45-46H,9-32H2,1-8H3/b53-43-,54-44+/t33-,34-,35+,36+,37+,38+,39+,40+,41+,42+,45+,46+,49?,50+,51?,52+/m1/s1; Key:AOAFJVPZPNBTQX-VNBRUOELSA-N

Bolazine capronate (INN) (brand name Roxilon Inject), also known as bolazine caproate or bolazine hexanoate, as well as di(drostanolone capronate) azine or 2α-methyl-5α-androstan-17β-ol-3-one 17β-hexanoate azine, is a synthetic, injected androgen/anabolic steroid (AAS), and derivative of dihydrotestosterone (DHT). It is an androgen ester – specifically, the C17β hexanoate ester of bolazine.

== See also ==
- List of androgen esters § Dihydrotestosterone esters
