= Hydroxystenozole =

Chemical compound

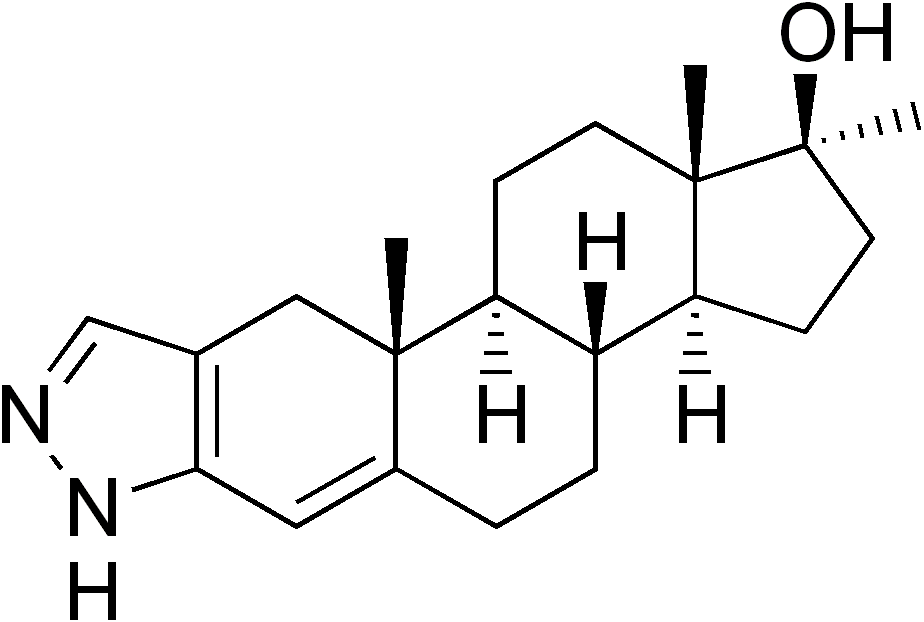

Clinical data
- Other names: NSC-43194; 4-Dehydrostanozolol; 17α-Methyl-2'H-androsta-2,4-dieno[3,2-c]pyrazol-17β-ol
- Routes of administration: By mouth
- Drug class: Androgen; Anabolic steroid
- ATC code: None

Identifiers
- IUPAC name: (1S,3aS,3bR,10aR,10bS,12aS)-1,10a,12a-trimethyl-1,2,3,3a,3b,4,5,7,10,10a,10b,11,12,12a-tetradecahydrocyclopenta[5,6]naphtho[1,2-f]indazol-1-ol
- CAS Number: 19120-01-5 5697-57-4
- PubChem CID: 238684
- ChemSpider: 208502
- UNII: 5OW19U0553
- ChEBI: CHEBI:79555
- ChEMBL: ChEMBL2105010
- CompTox Dashboard (EPA): DTXSID70172642

Chemical and physical data
- Formula: C_{21}H_{30}N_{2}O
- Molar mass: 326.484 g·mol^{−1}
- 3D model (JSmol): Interactive image
- SMILES: C[C@]12CC[C@H]3[C@H]([C@@H]1CC[C@]2(C)O)CCC4=CC5=C(C[C@]34C)C=NN5
- InChI: InChI=1S/C21H30N2O/c1-19-11-13-12-22-23-18(13)10-14(19)4-5-15-16(19)6-8-20(2)17(15)7-9-21(20,3)24/h10,12,15-17,24H,4-9,11H2,1-3H3,(H,22,23)/t15-,16+,17+,19+,20+,21+/m1/s1; Key:OIIHTRLQCQVVQC-OBQKJFGGSA-N

Hydroxystenozole (INN), also known as 17α-methylandrost-4-eno[3,2-c]pyrazol-17β-ol, is an orally active androgen/anabolic steroid (AAS) and a 17α-alkylated derivative of testosterone that was described in the literature in 1967 but was never marketed. It is closely related to stanozolol (17α-methyl-5α-androstano[3,2-c]pyrazol-17β-ol), differing from it only in hydrogenation (i.e., double bonds and their placement).
