= Methyltestosterone 3-hexyl ether =

Synthetic anabolic-androgenic steroid and an androgen ether

Clinical data
- Trade names: Androgénol, Enoltestovis, Enoltestovister
- Other names: 17α-Methyltestosterone 3-hexyl enol ether; 17α-Methylandrost-3,5-dien-17β-ol-3-one 3-hexyl ether; 3-(Hexyloxy)-17α-methylandrosta-3,5-dien-17β-ol

Identifiers
- IUPAC name: (8R,9S,10R,13S,14S,17S)-3-Hexoxy-10,13,17-trimethyl-1,2,7,8,9,11,12,14,15,16-decahydrocyclopenta[a]phenanthren-17-ol
- CAS Number: 1852-73-9
- PubChem CID: 92135812
- ChemSpider: 52084721
- UNII: 3FFM4L8F61

Chemical and physical data
- Formula: C_{26}H_{42}O_{2}
- Molar mass: 386.620 g·mol^{−1}
- 3D model (JSmol): Interactive image
- SMILES: CCCCCCOC1=CC2=CC[C@@H]3[C@@H]([C@]2(CC1)C)CC[C@]4([C@H]3CC[C@]4(C)O)C
- InChI: InChI=1S/C26H42O2/c1-5-6-7-8-17-28-20-11-14-24(2)19(18-20)9-10-21-22(24)12-15-25(3)23(21)13-16-26(25,4)27/h9,18,21-23,27H,5-8,10-17H2,1-4H3/t21-,22+,23+,24+,25+,26+/m1/s1; Key:QPBGOXFXPXMJBT-UXUCURBISA-N

Methyltestosterone 3-hexyl ether (brand names Androgénol, Enoltestovis, Enoltestovister), or 17α-methyltestosterone 3-hexyl enol ether, also known as 17α-methylandrost-3,5-dien-17β-ol-3-one 3-hexyl ether, is a synthetic anabolic-androgenic steroid and an androgen ether – specifically, the 3-hexyl ether of methyltestosterone.

== See also ==
- Penmesterol (methyltestosterone 3-cyclopentyl enol ether)
