= Methylhydroxynandrolone =

Chemical compound

Clinical data
- Other names: MOHN; MHN; 4-Hydroxy-17α-methyl-19-nortestosterone; HMNT; 4,17β-Dihydroxy-17α-methylestr-4-en-3-one
- Routes of administration: By mouth
- Drug class: Androgen; Anabolic steroid

Identifiers
- IUPAC name: 4,17-dihydroxy-13,17-dimethyl-1,2,6,7,8,9,10,11,12,14,15,16-dodecahydrocyclopenta[a]phenanthren-3-one
- CAS Number: 2747-16-2
- PubChem CID: 351707
- ChemSpider: 312271
- UNII: AL9HUA7C4C

Chemical and physical data
- Formula: C_{19}H_{28}O_{3}
- Molar mass: 304.430 g·mol^{−1}
- 3D model (JSmol): Interactive image
- SMILES: CC12CCC3C(C1CCC2(C)O)CCC4=C(C(=O)CCC34)O
- InChI: InChI=1S/C19H28O3/c1-18-9-7-12-11-5-6-16(20)17(21)14(11)4-3-13(12)15(18)8-10-19(18,2)22/h11-13,15,21-22H,3-10H2,1-2H3; Key:CLNUZOCYKSHICX-UHFFFAOYSA-N

Methylhydroxynandrolone (MOHN, MHN), also known as 4-hydroxy-17α-methyl-19-nortestosterone (HMNT), as well as 4,17β-dihydroxy-17α-methylestr-4-en-3-one, is a synthetic, orally active anabolic–androgenic steroid (AAS) and a 17α-alkylated derivative of nandrolone (19-nortestosterone) which was never marketed. It was first described in 1964 and was studied in the treatment of breast cancer, but was not introduced for clinical use. The drug re-emerged in 2004 when it started being sold on the Internet as a "dietary supplement". MOHN joined other AAS as a controlled substance in the United States on 20 January 2005.

MOHN is non-aromatizable due to the presence of a hydroxy group at the C4 position, and for this reason, poses no risk of estrogenic side effects like gynecomastia at any dosage, unlike many other AAS. 5α-Reduction is also inhibited by the C4 hydroxy group of MOHN and, because of this, MOHN may have a relatively higher ratio of androgenic to anabolic activity than other nandrolone derivatives (as 5α-reduction, opposite to the case of most other AAS, decreases AAS potency for most nandrolone derivatives). Early assays found that MOHN had approximately 13 times the anabolic activity and 3 times the androgenic activity of methyltestosterone.

MOHN is the 4-hydroxylated derivative of normethandrone (17α-methyl-19-nortestosterone), the 17α-methylated derivative of oxabolone (4-hydroxy-19-nortestosterone), the 4-hydroxylated and 17α-methylated derivative of nandrolone (19-nortestosterone), and the 19-demethylated analogue of oxymesterone (4-hydroxy-17α-methyltestosterone).

== See also ==
- List of androgens/anabolic steroids
