= Ethyltestosterone =

Synthetic anabolic steroid

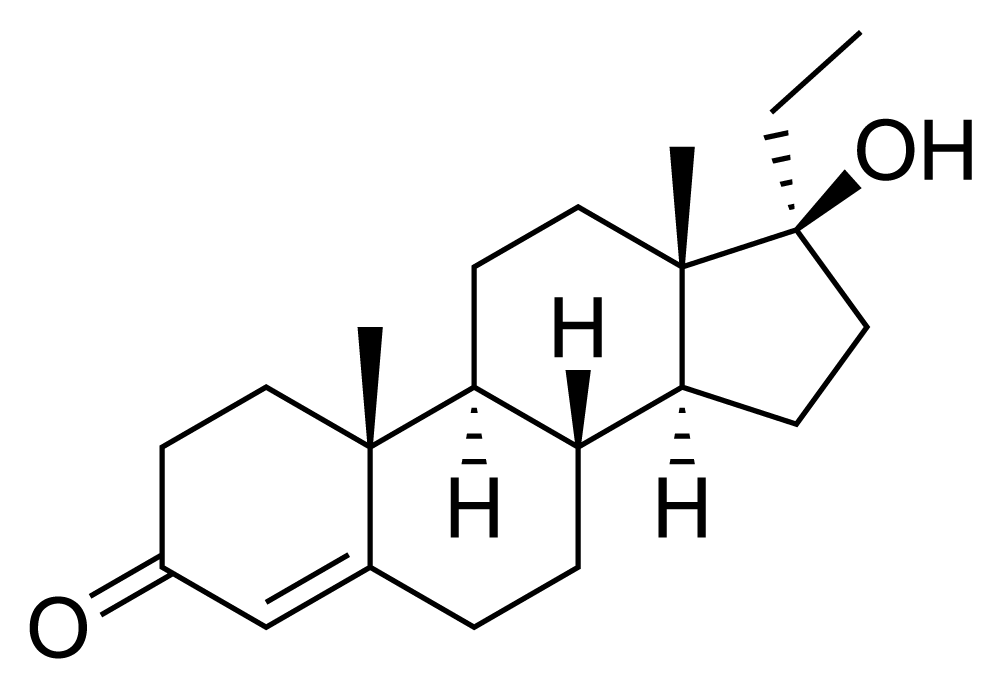

Clinical data
- Other names: 17α-Ethyltestosterone; 17α-Ethylandrost-4-en-17β-ol-3-one; 17α-Pregn-4-en-17-ol-3-one
- Routes of administration: By mouth

Identifiers
- IUPAC name: (8R,9S,10R,13S,14S,17S)-17-ethyl-17-hydroxy-10,13-dimethyl-2,6,7,8,9,11,12,14,15,16-decahydro-1H-cyclopenta[a]phenanthren-3-one
- CAS Number: 1235-97-8
- PubChem CID: 13908542
- ChemSpider: 18504533
- UNII: 4D305M9KPT
- ChEMBL: ChEMBL391236
- CompTox Dashboard (EPA): DTXSID30924523

Chemical and physical data
- Formula: C_{21}H_{32}O_{2}
- Molar mass: 316.485 g·mol^{−1}
- 3D model (JSmol): Interactive image
- SMILES: CC[C@@]1(CC[C@@H]2[C@@]1(CC[C@H]3[C@H]2CCC4=CC(=O)CC[C@]34C)C)O
- InChI: InChI=1S/C21H32O2/c1-4-21(23)12-9-18-16-6-5-14-13-15(22)7-10-19(14,2)17(16)8-11-20(18,21)3/h13,16-18,23H,4-12H2,1-3H3/t16-,17+,18+,19+,20+,21+/m1/s1; Key:FGPGANCDNDLUST-CEGNMAFCSA-N

Ethyltestosterone, or 17α-ethyltestosterone, also known as 17α-ethylandrost-4-en-17β-ol-3-one or 17α-pregn-4-en-17-ol-3-one, is a synthetic, orally active anabolic–androgenic steroid (AAS) of the 17α-alkylated group related to methyltestosterone which was never marketed. Like methyltestosterone, ethyltestosterone is the parent compound of many AAS. Derivatives of ethyltestosterone include norethandrolone (ethylnandrolone, ethylestrenolone), ethylestrenol (ethylnandrol), norboletone, ethyldienolone, tetrahydrogestrinone, bolenol (ethylnorandrostenol), and propetandrol.

Ethyltestosterone is described as a very weak AAS and is considerably weaker as an AAS than is methyltestosterone. It is reported to have 1/10 of the anabolic potency and 1/20 of the androgenic potency of testosterone propionate in rodents. Ethyltestosterone was also inactive in boys with dwarfism at 20 to 40 mg/day orally. The low potency of ethyltestosterone is in notable contrast to norethandrolone (17α-ethyl-19-nortestosterone), the C19 nor analogue. Analogues of ethyltestosterone with longer C17α chains such as propyltestosterone (topterone) have further reduced androgenic activity or even antiandrogenic activity. In contrast to ethyltestosterone, its 19-demethyl variant, norethandrolone, is a potent AAS comparable in anabolic activity to testosterone propionate.

== See also ==
- List of androgens/anabolic steroids
