= Tiomesterone =

Chemical compound

Clinical data
- Trade names: Emdabol, Embadol, Emdabolin, Protabol
- Other names: Thiomesterone; Thiomestrone; StA 307
- Routes of administration: Oral

Identifiers
- IUPAC name: S-[(1S,7R,8S,9S,10R,13S,14S,17S)-1-acetylsulfanyl-17-hydroxy-10,13,17-trimethyl-3-oxo-2,6,7,8,9,11,12,14,15,16-decahydro-1H-cyclopenta[a]phenanthren-7-yl] ethanethioate
- CAS Number: 2205-73-4
- PubChem CID: 16626
- ChemSpider: 15763
- UNII: W5K3712F4H
- CompTox Dashboard (EPA): DTXSID50176527
- ECHA InfoCard: 100.016.923

Chemical and physical data
- Formula: C_{24}H_{34}O_{4}S_{2}
- Molar mass: 450.65 g·mol^{−1}
- 3D model (JSmol): Interactive image
- SMILES: CC(=O)S[C@@H]1CC2=CC(=O)C[C@@H]([C@@]2([C@@H]3[C@@H]1[C@@H]4CC[C@]([C@]4(CC3)C)(C)O)C)SC(=O)C
- InChI: InChI=1S/C24H34O4S2/c1-13(25)29-19-11-15-10-16(27)12-20(30-14(2)26)24(15,5)18-6-8-22(3)17(21(18)19)7-9-23(22,4)28/h10,17-21,28H,6-9,11-12H2,1-5H3/t17-,18-,19+,20-,21-,22-,23-,24-/m0/s1; Key:YUOZKOLALXNELS-SQVYRKCQSA-N

Tiomesterone (INN, JAN; thiomesterone (BAN); also known as 1α,7α-bis(acetylthio)-17α-methylandrost-4-en-17β-ol-3-one; developmental code StA 307; brand names Emdabol, Embadol, Emdabolin, and Protabol) is a synthetic, orally active anabolic-androgenic steroid (AAS) and a 17α-alkylated derivative of testosterone. It was described in 1963.
