= Dienedione =

Chemical compound

Clinical data
- Other names: 19-Nor-4,9(10)-androstadienedione; Estradienedione, 19-Norandrosta-4,9(10)-diene-3,17-dione; Estra-4,9(10)-diene-3,17-dione
- Routes of administration: Oral

Legal status
- Legal status: UK: Class C; US: Schedule III

Identifiers
- IUPAC name: 13-methyl-1,2,6,7,8,11,12,14,15,16-decahydrocyclopenta[a]phenanthrene-3,17-dione
- CAS Number: 5173-46-6
- PubChem CID: 9835169
- ChemSpider: 8010890
- UNII: 32XW5U770B
- ChEBI: CHEBI:190043
- CompTox Dashboard (EPA): DTXSID10199676
- ECHA InfoCard: 100.112.341

Chemical and physical data
- Formula: C_{18}H_{22}O_{2}
- Molar mass: 270.372 g·mol^{−1}
- 3D model (JSmol): Interactive image
- SMILES: C[C@]12CCC3=C4CCC(=O)C=C4CC[C@H]3[C@@H]1CCC2=O
- InChI: InChI=1S/C18H22O2/c1-18-9-8-14-13-5-3-12(19)10-11(13)2-4-15(14)16(18)6-7-17(18)20/h10,15-16H,2-9H2,1H3/t15-,16+,18+/m1/s1; Key:BHTWZQKERRCPRZ-RYRKJORJSA-N

Dienedione, also known as estra-4,9-diene-3,17-dione, is a synthetic, orally active anabolic-androgenic steroid (AAS) of the 19-nortestosterone group that was never introduced for medical use. It is thought to be a prohormone of dienolone. The drug became a controlled substance in the US on January 4, 2010, and is classified as a Schedule III anabolic steroid under the United States Controlled Substances Act. Previous to this, it was sold as a bodybuilding supplement within the United States, and often mistakenly marketed as a prohormone for trenbolone, a veterinary steroid. Prior to its scheduling, it was part of a number of supplements that were seized during FDA enforcement of Bodybuilding.com for selling unapproved new drugs. The actual active metabolite, dienolone, is almost identical to trenbolone structurally, but lacks the C11 double bond.

Dienedione use is also prohibited in horses. However, small amounts are endogenously produced in horses.

== Applications ==
Dienedione finds use in the synthesis of more privileged steroids:

=== Direct synthesis ===
- Trenbolone
- Methyltrienolone
- Norgestrienone
- Methyldienolone
- Trimegestone
- Estrogen

=== Synthesis from ethylene deltenone, the ethyleneglycol cyclic ketal of dienedione ===
- Mifepristone
- Ulipristal
- Asoprisnil
- Onapristone
- 11β-Methyl-19-nortestosterone[9].

=== One-pot synthesis ===
- Dienogest

=== Synthesis from the dimethyl acetal [10109-76-9] ===
- Altrenogest

== Chemistry ==
=== Synthesis ===
A congenial synthesis of dienedione starts from Estra-4-ene-3,17-dione (PC12346074). This is produced from estrone 3-methyl ether by protection as the ketal, Birch reduction of the aromatic group, and acid hydrolysis. The procedure involved ketalization of both carbonyl groups with concomitant olefin migration from C4 to C5(10), epoxide formation with m-CPBA, hydrolysis of the oxirane and dehydration in concentrated acid solution. However no yields were disclosed in the patent. In the dienolone method, the C5(10) olefin is brominated followed by a 2x dehydrohalogenation procedure, with high yields being reported.

Dienedione was synthesized from dienolone (cmp16) in 90% yield.

The semi-synthetic chemical synthesis has been reported by Organon:

The starting material is called Sitolactone [126784-20-1] (1); It is a commercially available product obtained by microbiological degradation of phytosterols which are waste products from the processing of soy. The first step consists of a Grignard reaction with 5-chloro 2-pentanone-neopentylacetal [88128-57-8] (2) to give (3aS,4S,5R,7aS)-5-hydroxy-7a-methyl-4-(3-oxo-6-(2,5,5-trimethyl-1,3-dioxan-2-yl)hexyl)octahydro-1H-inden-1-one (3). Halogenation with chlorine gas in the presence of pyridine base gave (+)-3,3-(dimethylpropylendioxy)-4,5-seco-estr-9-ene-5,17-dione [88128-61-4] (4). The hydrolysis of the ketal in weak acid led to (+)-4,5-seco-estr-9-ene-3,5,17-trione [10582-53-3] (5). Lastly, an intramolecular aldol condensation in the presence of t-BuOK base completed the synthesis of dienedione (6).

Improvements to the general scheme have recently been reported in modern Chinese patents: For example, oxidation of 3 with concomitant deprotection of the ketal can allow for a one-pot double Aldol condensation to yield dienedione in a single step.

== See also ==
- Androstenedione
- Bolandiol
- Bolandione
- Boldione
