= Bolazine =

Chemical compound

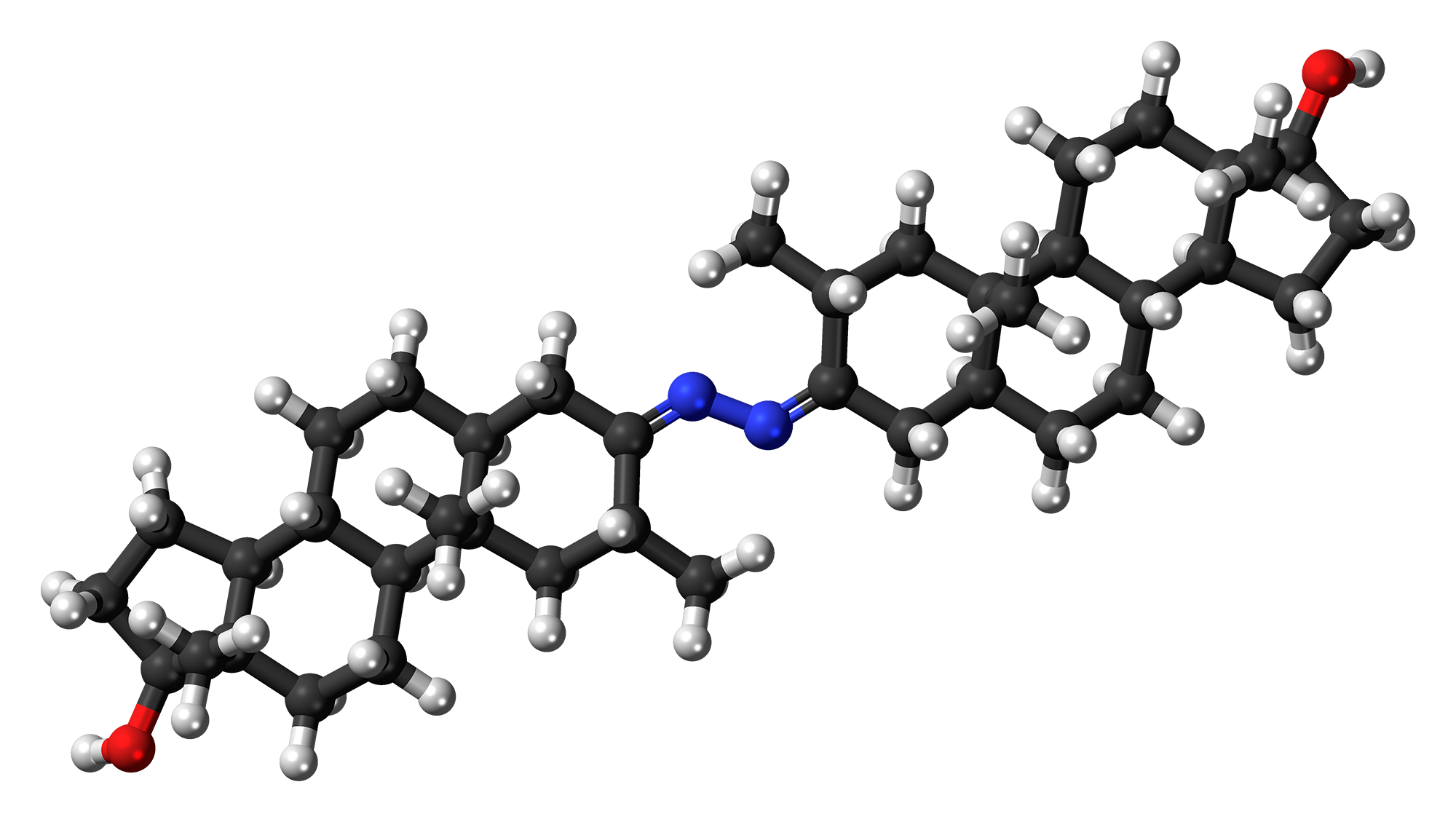

Clinical data
- Other names: 2α-methyl-5α-androstan-17β-ol-3-one azine

Identifiers
- IUPAC name: (2R,3E,5S,8R,9S,10S,13S,14S,17S)-3-[(E)-[(10S,13R)-15-hydroxy-2,10,13-trimethyl-1,2,4,5,6,7,8,9,11,12,14,15,16,17-tetradecahydrocyclopenta[a]phenanthren-3-ylidene]hydrazinylidene]-2,10,13-trimethyl-1,2,4,5,6,7,8,9,11,12,14,15,16,17-tetradecahydrocyclopenta[a]phenanthren-17-ol
- CAS Number: 4267-81-6
- PubChem CID: 9578205
- ChemSpider: 16736833
- UNII: 508ISH42Z9
- ChEMBL: ChEMBL2104408

Chemical and physical data
- Formula: C_{40}H_{64}N_{2}O_{2}
- Molar mass: 604.964 g·mol^{−1}
- 3D model (JSmol): Interactive image
- SMILES: C[C@@]23[C@](CC[C@]4([H])[C@@]([H])3CC[C@@]5(C)[C@]([H])4CC[C@@H]5O)([H])C/C([C@H](C)C2)=N/N=C1[C@H](C)C[C@@]6(C)[C@](CC[C@]7([H])[C@@]([H])6CC[C@@]8(C)[C@]([H])7CC[C@@H]8O)([H])C/1
- InChI: InChI=1S/C40H64N2O2/c1-23-21-39(5)25(7-9-27-29-11-13-35(43)37(29,3)17-15-31(27)39)19-33(23)41-42-34-20-26-8-10-28-30-12-14-36(44)38(30,4)18-16-32(28)40(26,6)22-24(34)2/h23-32,35-36,43-44H,7-22H2,1-6H3/b41-33+,42-34+/t23-,24-,25+,26+,27+,28+,29+,30+,31+,32+,35+,36+,37+,38+,39+,40+/m1/s1; Key:BQDZMZRUXNFTQT-KSJDNICASA-N

Bolazine (INN), also known as 2α-methyl-5α-androstan-17β-ol-3-one azine, is a synthetic androgen/anabolic steroid (AAS) of the dihydrotestosterone (DHT) group which was never marketed. It is not orally active and is used as the ester prodrug bolazine capronate (brand name Roxilon Inject) via depot intramuscular injection. Bolazine has a unique and unusual chemical structure, being a dimer of drostanolone linked at the C3 position of the A-ring by an azine group, and reportedly acts as a prodrug of drostanolone.

== See also ==
- List of androgens/anabolic steroids
