= Allylestrenol =

Chemical compound

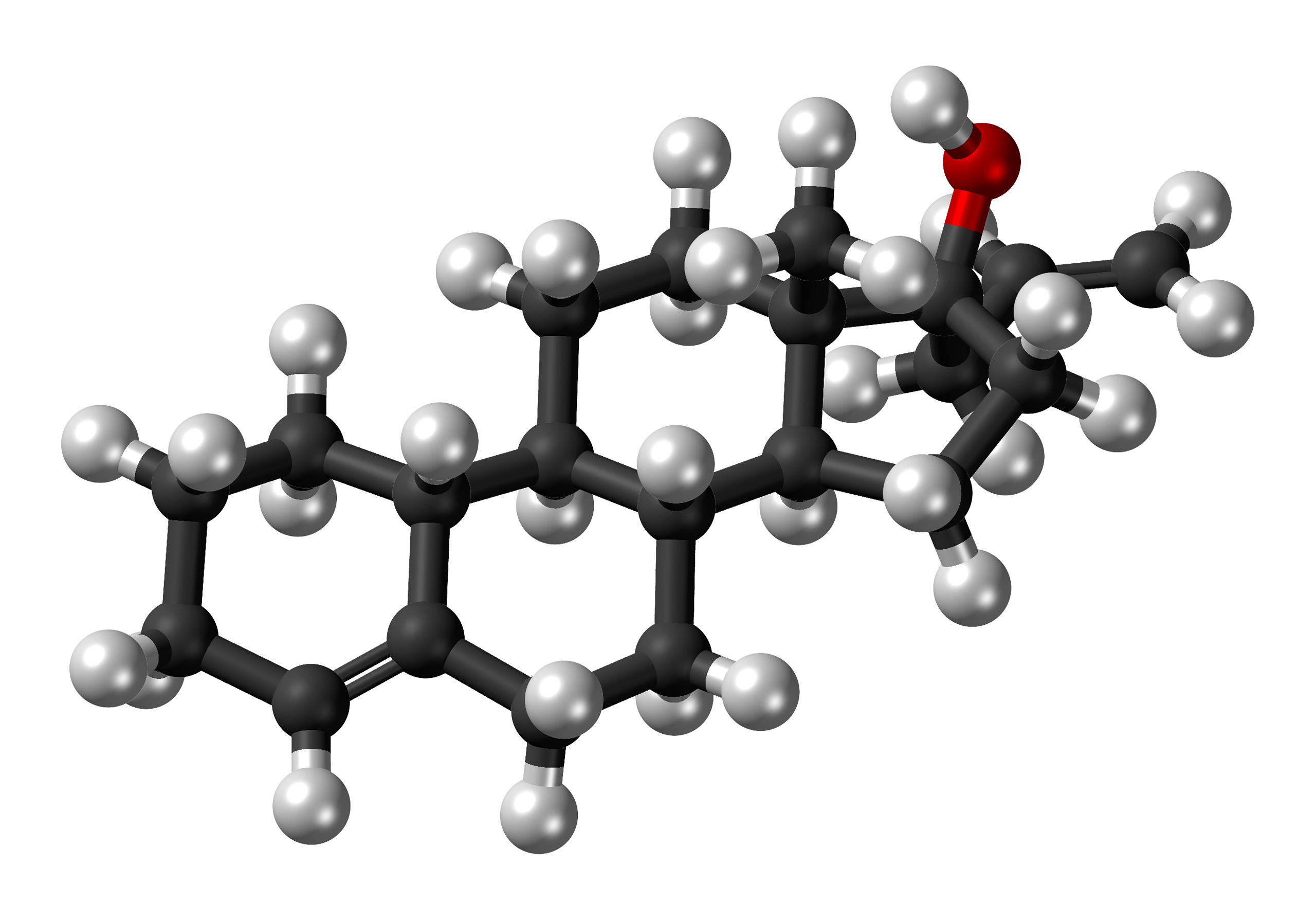

Clinical data
- Trade names: Gestanin, Gestanon, Perselin, Turinal, others
- Other names: Allyloestrenol; SC-6393; Org AL-25; 3-Deketo-17α-allyl-19-nortestosterone; 17α-Allylestr-4-en-17β-ol; 17α-(Prop-2-en-1-yl)estr-4-en-17β-ol
- Pregnancy category: Used in threatened miscarriage and recurrent pregnancy loss
- Routes of administration: By mouth
- Drug class: Progestogen; Progestin
- ATC code: G03DC01 (WHO)

Legal status
- Legal status: In general: ℞ (Prescription only)

Pharmacokinetic data
- Protein binding: "Considerable" (and low affinity for SHBG)
- Metabolism: Liver (reduction, hydroxylation, conjugation; CYP3A4)
- Metabolites: • 17α-Allyl-19-NT
- Elimination half-life: "Several hours" or 10 hours
- Excretion: Urine (as conjugates)

Identifiers
- IUPAC name: (8R,9S,10R,13S,14S,17R)-13-methyl-17-prop-2-enyl-2,3,6,7,8,9,10,11,12,14,15,16-dodecahydro-1H-cyclopenta[a]phenanthren-17-ol
- CAS Number: 432-60-0
- PubChem CID: 235905
- DrugBank: DB01431
- ChemSpider: 205855
- UNII: I47VB5DZ8O
- KEGG: D01374
- ChEBI: CHEBI:31189
- ChEMBL: ChEMBL2105618
- CompTox Dashboard (EPA): DTXSID9022574
- ECHA InfoCard: 100.006.440

Chemical and physical data
- Formula: C_{21}H_{32}O
- Molar mass: 300.486 g·mol^{−1}
- 3D model (JSmol): Interactive image
- SMILES: C[C@]12CC[C@H]3[C@H]([C@@H]1CC[C@]2(CC=C)O)CCC4=CCCC[C@H]34
- InChI: InChI=1S/C21H32O/c1-3-12-21(22)14-11-19-18-9-8-15-6-4-5-7-16(15)17(18)10-13-20(19,21)2/h3,6,16-19,22H,1,4-5,7-14H2,2H3/t16-,17+,18+,19-,20-,21-/m0/s1; Key:ATXHVCQZZJYMCF-XUDSTZEESA-N

Allylestrenol, sold under the brand names Gestanin and Turinal among others, is a progestin medication which is used to treat recurrent and threatened miscarriage and to prevent premature labor in pregnant women. However, except in the case of proven progesterone deficiency, its use for such purposes is no longer recommended. A Cochrane review in 2025 found that it had little to no effect in subsequent pregnancy outcomes for women with unexplained, recurrent miscarriage. It is also used in Japan to treat benign prostatic hyperplasia (BPH) in men. The medication is used alone and is not formulated in combination with an estrogen. It is taken by mouth.

Side effects of allylestrenol are few and have not been well-defined, but are assumed to be similar to those of related medications. Allylestrenol is a progestin, or a synthetic progestogen, and hence is an agonist of the progesterone receptor, the biological target of progestogens like progesterone. It has no other important hormonal activity. The medication is a prodrug of 17α-allyl-19-nortestosterone (3-ketoallylestrenol) in the body.

Allylestrenol was first described in 1958 and was introduced for medical use by 1961. It has been marketed widely throughout the world in the past, but today its availability and usage are relatively limited. It remains available in a few European countries and in a number of Asian countries.

== Medical uses ==
Allylestrenol is used in the treatment of recurrent and threatened miscarriage and to prevent premature labor. However, except in the case of proven progesterone deficiency, its use for such indications is no longer recommended. Allylestrenol is one of only a handful of progestogens that has commonly been used for such purposes, the others including progesterone, hydroxyprogesterone caproate, and dydrogesterone. The medication has also been studied in the treatment of gynecological disorders such as amenorrhea, irregular menstruation, and premenstrual syndrome. Unlike other progestins, allylestrenol has not been used in hormonal contraception or in menopausal hormone therapy. In one study, it was found to be inadequate for endometrial transformation in women in combination with estradiol valerate. On the other hand, allylestrenol was found to be effective in the treatment of hot flashes in postmenopausal women.

Allylestrenol has been commonly used in Japan at high dosages, typically 50 mg/day but as much as 100 mg/day, to treat BPH in men. Related medications that have similarly been used to treat BPH, particularly in Japan, include chlormadinone acetate, gestonorone caproate, and oxendolone. Allylestrenol has also been studied in the treatment of prostate cancer in Japan. The medication has been studied as a puberty blocker in the treatment of precocious puberty as well.

=== Available forms ===
Allylestrenol is available in the form of 5 mg oral tablets. It is typically used at a dosage of 5 to 40 mg/day. In Japan, a 25 mg allylestrenol oral tablet, under the brand name Perselin, is marketed for the treatment of BPH.

== Side effects ==
Allylestrenol should not be taken by people who are allergic to ibuprofen or naproxen, or who have salicylate intolerance or a more generalized drug intolerance to NSAIDs, and caution should be exercised in those with asthma or NSAID-precipitated bronchospasm. Owing to its effect on the stomach lining, manufacturers recommend people with peptic ulcers, mild diabetes, or gastritis seek medical advice before using allylestrenol.

Side effects of allylestrenol are few and have not been well-defined, but are assumed to be similar to those of related medications (i.e., other progestins). When used at high dosages in the treatment of BPH in men, allylestrenol can cause symptoms of hypogonadism and sexual dysfunction. The medication indeloxazine may be able to counteract allylestrenol-associated sexual dysfunction. Allylestrenol has no androgenic or other off-target hormonal side effects.

== Pharmacology ==
=== Pharmacodynamics ===
17α-Allyl-19-nortestosterone, also known as 3-ketoallylestrenol, the active form of allylestrenol.

==== Progestogenic and off-target activities ====
Allylestrenol is a progestogen, or an agonist of the progesterone receptor (PR). It is lacking the keto group at the C3 position (part of the important 3-keto-4-ene structure) that is common in progestogens and is considered to be necessary for activity, and in relation to this, is thought to be a prodrug of 17α-allyl-19-nortestosterone (3-ketoallylestrenol). Allylestrenol is a far less potent progestogen than many other 19-nortestosterone derivatives. The effective ovulation-inhibiting or contraceptive dosage of allylestrenol in women has been studied, albeit limitedly. At 20 mg/day allylestrenol, ovulation occurred in 50% of 6 cycles, and at 25 mg/day, ovulation occurred in 0% of 3 cycles. The total endometrial transformation dosage of allylestrenol in women across the cycle is 150 to 250 mg. Unlike virtually all other 19-nortestosterone derivatives, allylestrenol is reported to be a pure progestogen and hence to be devoid of androgenic, estrogenic, and glucocorticoid activity. As such, it appears to have properties more similar to those of natural progesterone.

The binding and activity profiles of allylestrenol and its major active metabolite at steroid hormone receptors and related proteins have been studied. Allylestrenol has less than 0.2% of the affinity of ORG-2058 and less than 2% of the affinity of progesterone for the PR. Similarly, it has less than 0.2% of the affinity of testosterone for the androgen receptor (AR), less than 0.2% of the affinity of estradiol for the estrogen receptor (ER), less than 0.2% of the affinity of dexamethasone for the glucocorticoid receptor (GR), and 0.9% of the affinity of testosterone for sex hormone-binding globulin (SHBG). Conversely, its metabolite 17α-allyl-19-nortestosterone has 24% of the affinity of ORG-2058 and 186% of the affinity of progesterone for the PR, 4.5% of the affinity of testosterone for the AR, 9.8% of the affinity of dexamethasone for the GR, and 2.8% of the affinity of testosterone for SHBG, while it similarly has less than 0.2% of the affinity of estradiol for the ER. The affinity of 17α-allyl-19-nortestosterone for the AR was less than that of norethisterone and medroxyprogesterone acetate and its affinity for SHBG was much lower than that of norethisterone. These findings may help to explain the absence of teratogenic effects of allylestrenol on the external genitalia of female and male rat fetuses.

Relative affinities (%) of allylestrenol and metabolites
Compound	PR	AR	ER	GR	MR	SHBG	CBG
Allylestrenol	0	0	0	0	?	1	?
17α-Allyl-19-NT	186	5	0	10	?	3	?
Notes: Values are percentages (%). Reference ligands (100%) were P4 for the PR, T for the AR, E2 for the ER, DEXA for the GR, aldosterone for the MR, T for SHBG, and cortisol for CBG. Sources:

==== Antigonadotropic effects ====
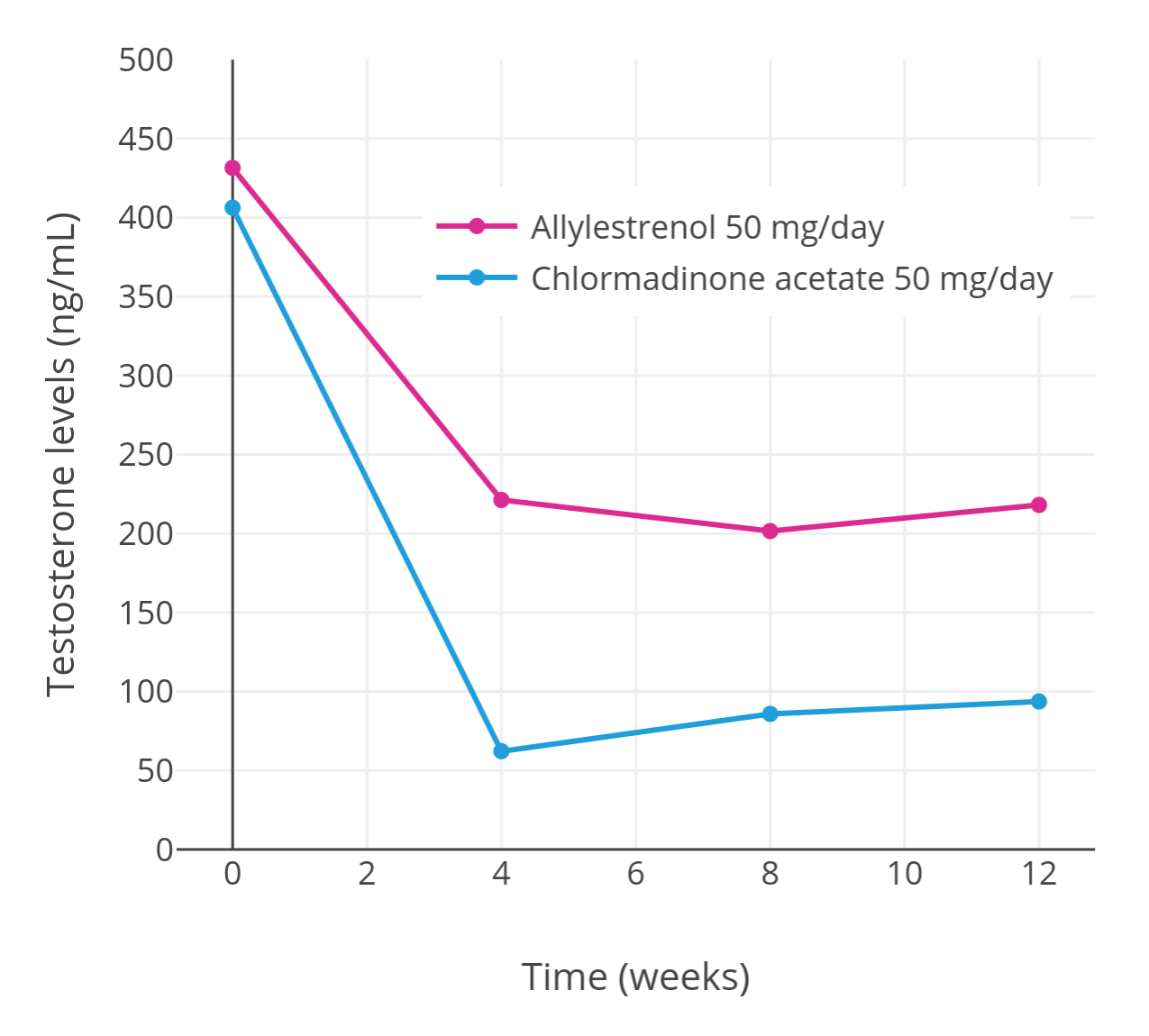
Testosterone levels with 50 mg/day allylestrenol or 50 mg/day chlormadinone acetate orally over 12 weeks in men with benign prostatic hyperplasia.

Similarly to other progestogens, allylestrenol has potent antigonadotropic effects. It is able to considerably decrease circulating concentrations of luteinizing hormone, testosterone, and dihydrotestosterone in men. At a dosage of 50 mg/day, allylestrenol has been found to suppress circulating testosterone levels by 78% in men with BPH. This is about the maximum that progestogens are known to be able to suppress testosterone levels in men. In accordance, the reduction of testosterone and luteinizing hormone levels with allylestrenol in men has been found in a study to be equivalent to that of chlormadinone acetate and oxendolone. However, another study found a significantly lower decrease in testosterone levels with 50 mg/day allylestrenol relative to 50 mg/day chlormadinone acetate of about 49–52% versus 76–85%, respectively. Animal research suggests that allylestrenol produces its beneficial effects in BPH via its antigonadotropic effects and consequent suppression of androgen levels and inhibition of prostate gland growth, similarly to other progestins. Some studies have found that allylestrenol is less effective for BPH than chlormadinone acetate but also produces fewer side effects and sexual dysfunction. Allylestrenol therapy for BPH is associated with a significant decrease in prostate-specific antigen levels, which may mask the detection of prostate cancer.

==== Other activities ====
Allylestrenol is not a significant 5α-reductase inhibitor. In one study, it showed about 80,000-fold lower potency for inhibition of 5α-reductase in vitro than the established 5α-reductase inhibitor epristeride (IC_{50} = 11.3 nM for epristeride and 890 μM for allylestrenol). In another study, there was 70% inhibition of 5α-reductase by allylestrenol at a concentration of 60 μM. This difference may have been due to different experimental conditions, but is still much lower than epristeride.

=== Pharmacokinetics ===
Following oral administration, peak levels of allylestrenol occur after 2 to 4 hours. The medication shows considerable plasma protein binding. It has relatively low affinity for SHBG, much lower than that of norethisterone. Allylestrenol is metabolized in the liver, via reduction, hydroxylation, and conjugation. It is known to be a substrate of CYP3A4. It is thought to be a prodrug of 17α-allyl-19-nortestosterone (3-ketoallylestrenol), which, in accordance, is a known active metabolite of allylestrenol. The biological half-life of allylestrenol has been reported to be "several hours" or, presumably in its active form, reportedly about 10 hours. In the blood, unchanged allylestrenol accounted for 15 to 40% of radioactivity, an unconjugated metabolite accounted for 4 to 10% of radioactivity, and the rest of the radioactivity corresponded to conjugated metabolites. Allylestrenol is eliminated mainly in urine, 44% by 24 hours and 67% within 4 days. It is excreted almost completely as conjugates, with 75% of these being sulfate conjugates and 24% being glucuronide conjugates.

== Chemistry ==
Allylestrenol, also known as 3-deketo-17α-allyl-19-nortestosterone or as 17α-allylestr-4-en-17β-ol, is a synthetic estrane steroid and a derivative of testosterone. It is a member of the estrane subgroup of the 19-nortestosterone family of progestins, but unlike most other 19-nortestosterone progestins, is not a derivative of norethisterone (17α-ethynyl-19-nortestosterone). This is because it possesses an allyl group at the C17α position rather than the usual ethynyl group. As such, along with altrenogest (17α-allyl-19-nor-δ^{9,11}-testosterone), allylestrenol is a derivative of 17α-allyltestosterone rather than of 17α-ethynyltestosterone.

Allylestrenol is also unique among most 19-nortestosterone progestins in that it lacks the ketone at the C3 position. It shares this property with lynestrenol (17α-ethynylestr-4-en-17β-ol), desogestrel (11-methylene-17α-ethynyl-18-methylestr-4-en-17β-ol), and the anabolic–androgenic steroid (AAS) ethylestrenol (17α-ethylestr-4-en-17β-ol). Allylestrenol is the C17α allyl and C3 deketo derivative of the AAS nandrolone (19-nortestosterone), as well as the C17α allyl and C3 deketo analogue of the AAS normethandrone (17α-methyl-19-nortestosterone) and norethandrolone (17α-methyl-19-nortestosterone).

=== Synthesis ===
Chemical syntheses of allylestrenol have been published.

A Chinese chemical synthesis of allylestrenol was recently reported: Prior art:

Bolandione [734-32-7] (1) is reacted with 1 equivalent of ethane-1,2-dithiol to give PC13831215 (2). Protection of the remaining ketone with ethyleneglycol gives PC71579263 (3). Reduction with lithium metal in liquid ammonia gives PC71579264 (4). Deprotection of the ketal protecting group by heating in aqueous acid gives Estr-4-en-17-one [3646-28-4] (5). Grignard reaction with allyl chloride completed the synthesis of allylestrenol (6).

== History ==
Allylestrenol was patented in 1958 and has been marketed for medical use since 1961. It was developed by Organon Laboratories.

== Society and culture ==
=== Generic names ===
Allylestrenol is the generic name of the drug and its INN, BAN, and JAN, while allylestrénol is its DCF and allilestrenolo is its DCIT. The BAN was originally allyloestrenol, but it was eventually changed. The medication is also known by its developmental code name SC-6393.

=== Brand names ===
The major brand names of allylestrenol include Gestanin, Gestanon, Perselin, and Turinal. It has also been marketed under a variety of other brand names, including Alese, Alilestrenol, Allynol, Allytry, Alynol, Anin, Arandal, Astanol, Cobarenol, Crestanon, Elmolan, Fetugard, Foegard, Fulterm, Gestanin, Gestanin, Gestanol, Gestanon, Gestanyn, Gestin, Geston, Gestormone, Gestrenol, Gravida, Gravidin, Gravinol, Gravion, Gravynon, Gynerol, Gynonys, Iugr, Lestron, Loestrol, Maintane, Meieston, Moresafe, Nidagest, Nobor, Orageston, Pelias, Preabor, Pregnolin, Pregtenol, Pregular, Prelab, Premaston, Prenolin, Prestrenol, Profar, Progeston, Protanon, and Shegest.

=== Availability ===
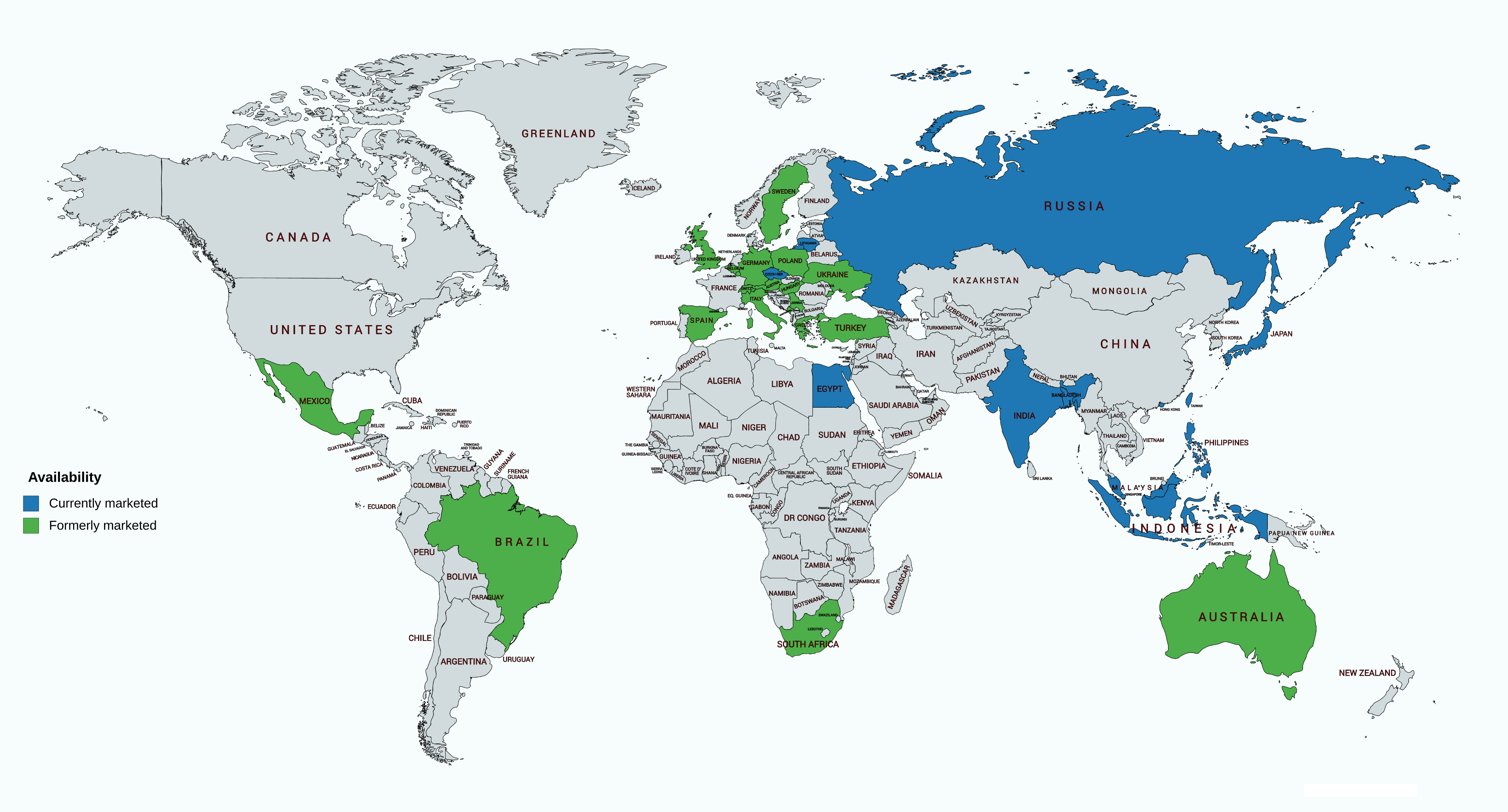
Availability of allylestrenol in countries throughout the world as of December 2017. Blue is currently marketed, green is formerly marketed.

Allylestrenol has been marketed widely throughout the world, including in Europe, Southern, Eastern, and Southeastern Asia, Africa, Oceania, and Latin America. However, although it has been widely marketed in the past, the availability of allylestrenol is relatively limited today. It appears to still be available in Bangladesh, the Czech Republic, Egypt, Hong Kong, India, Indonesia, Japan, Lithuania, Malaysia, the Philippines, Russia, Singapore, and Taiwan. Previously, allylestrenol has also been available in Australia, Austria, Belgium, Brazil, Germany, Greece, Hungary, Italy, Luxembourg, Mexico, Poland, South Africa, Spain, Sweden, Switzerland, Turkey, Ukraine, the United Kingdom, and Yugoslavia (now Serbia and Montenegro). However, it seems to have been discontinued in these countries. It does not seem to have been marketed in the United States or Canada.
