= Ethyldienolone =

Chemical compound

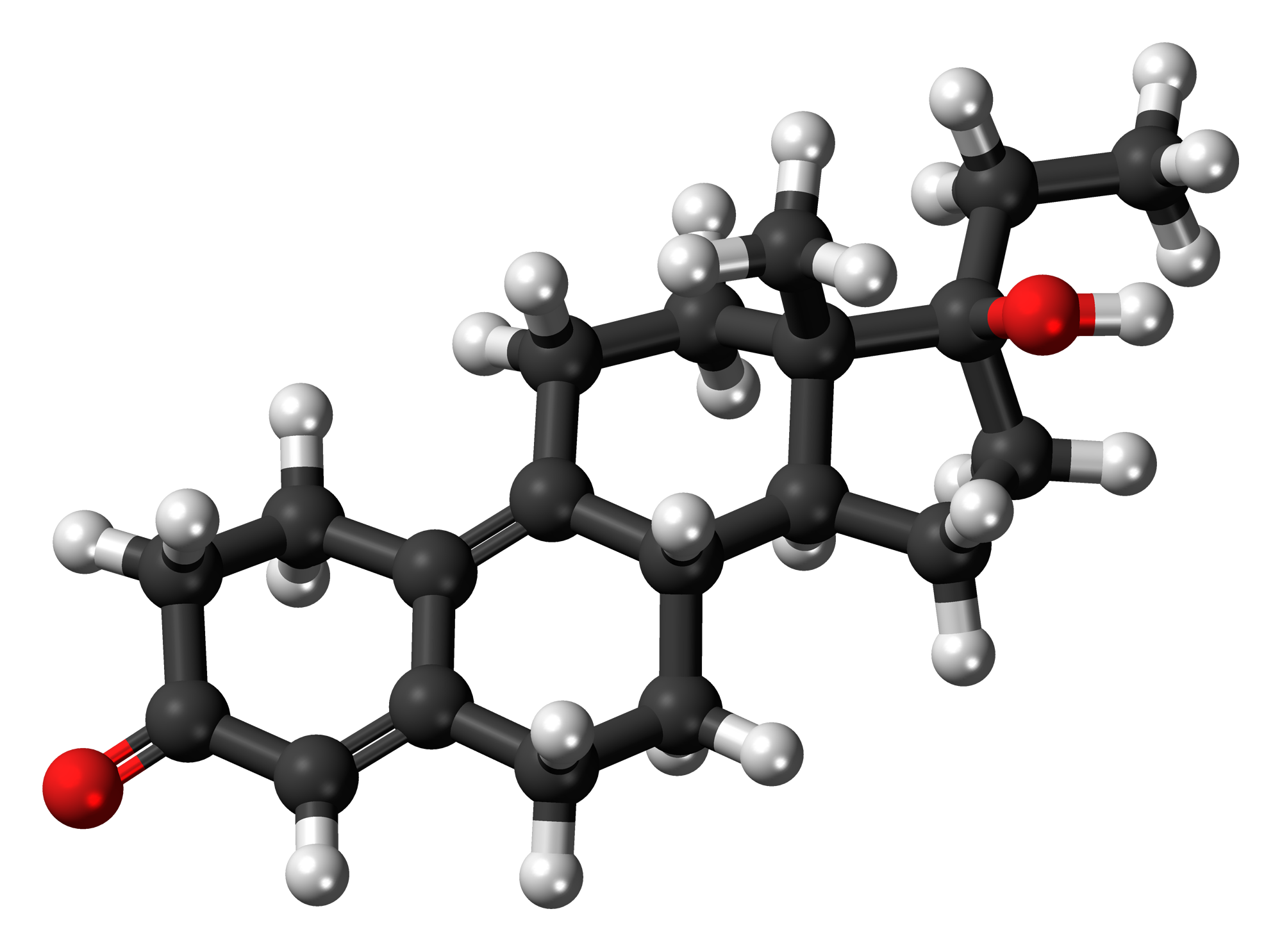

Clinical data
- Other names: 17α-Methyl-19-nor-δ^{9}-testosterone; 17α-Methylestra-4,9-dien-17β-ol-3-one
- Routes of administration: By mouth

Identifiers
- IUPAC name: (8S,13S,14S,17S)-17-ethyl-17-hydroxy-13-methyl-1,2,6,7,8,11,12,14,15,16-decahydrocyclopenta[a]phenanthren-3-one
- PubChem CID: 90479685
- ChemSpider: 34993055
- UNII: PHW6P6I5H7
- CompTox Dashboard (EPA): DTXSID001028772

Chemical and physical data
- Formula: C_{20}H_{28}O_{2}
- Molar mass: 300.442 g·mol^{−1}
- 3D model (JSmol): Interactive image
- SMILES: CC[C@@]1(CC[C@@H]2[C@@H]1CCC3=C4CCC(=O)C=C4CC[C@@H]23)O
- InChI: InChI=1S/C19H26O2/c1-2-19(21)10-9-17-16-5-3-12-11-13(20)4-6-14(12)15(16)7-8-18(17)19/h11,16-18,21H,2-10H2,1H3/t16-,17+,18+,19+/m1/s1; Key:MPJHQVVZUHVQJF-XWSJACJDSA-N

Ethyldienolone, also known as 17α-methyl-19-nor-δ^{9}-testosterone, as well as 17α-methylestra-4,9-dien-17β-ol-3-one, is synthetic, orally active anabolic-androgenic steroid (AAS) and a 17α-alkylated derivative of 19-nortestosterone. It is slightly more active than methyltestosterone when given orally. Ethyldienolone is closely related to dienolone and methyldienolone.

== See also ==
- Dienedione
- Metribolone
