= Methyldienolone =

Chemical compound

Clinical data
- Other names: RU-3467; 17α-Methylestra-4,9-dien-17β-ol-3-one
- Routes of administration: Oral

Legal status
- Legal status: US: Schedule III

Identifiers
- IUPAC name: (8S,13S,14S,17S)-17-hydroxy-13,17-dimethyl-1,2,6,7,8,11,12,14,15,16-decahydrocyclopenta[a]phenanthren-3-one
- CAS Number: 14531-89-6
- ChemSpider: 23208982
- UNII: 1K4L979D9L
- CompTox Dashboard (EPA): DTXSID70726902

Chemical and physical data
- Formula: C_{19}H_{26}O_{2}
- Molar mass: 286.415 g·mol^{−1}
- 3D model (JSmol): Interactive image
- SMILES: O=C1C=C2C(=C3CC[C@]4(C)[C@@](C)(O)CC[C@H]4[C@@H]3CC2)CC1
- InChI: InChI=1S/C19H26O2/c1-18-9-7-15-14-6-4-13(20)11-12(14)3-5-16(15)17(18)8-10-19(18,2)21/h11,16-17,21H,3-10H2,1-2H3/t16-,17+,18+,19+/m1/s1; Key:RDJBOAMEIJEKEY-XWSJACJDSA-N

Methyldienolone (developmental code name RU-3467), also known as 17α-methyl-19-nor-δ^{9}-testosterone, as well as 17α-methylestra-4,9-dien-17β-ol-3-one, is a synthetic, orally active anabolic-androgenic steroid (AAS) and a 17α-alkylated derivative of 19-nortestosterone. It is closely related to dienolone and ethyldienolone.

Methyldienolone is on the World Anti-Doping Agency's list of prohibited substances, and is therefore banned from use in most major sports.

== See also ==
- Dienedione
- Metribolone
