= Penmesterol =

Chemical compound

Clinical data
- Trade names: Pandocrine; Testopan
- Other names: RP-12222; 17α-Methyltestosterone 3-cyclopentyl enol ether
- Routes of administration: By mouth

Identifiers
- IUPAC name: (8R,9S,10R,13S,14S,17S)-3-Cyclopentyloxy-10,13,17-trimethyl-1,2,7,8,9,11,12,14,15,16-decahydrocyclopenta[a]phenanthren-17-ol
- CAS Number: 67-81-2
- PubChem CID: 20054971
- ChemSpider: 16735903
- UNII: D5F29U03HM
- ChEMBL: ChEMBL2104849
- CompTox Dashboard (EPA): DTXSID301018944
- ECHA InfoCard: 100.000.609

Chemical and physical data
- Formula: C_{25}H_{38}O_{2}
- Molar mass: 370.577 g·mol^{−1}
- 3D model (JSmol): Interactive image
- SMILES: C[C@]12CCC(=CC1=CC[C@@H]3[C@@H]2CC[C@]4([C@H]3CC[C@]4(C)O)C)OC5CCCC5
- InChI: InChI=1S/C25H38O2/c1-23-13-10-19(27-18-6-4-5-7-18)16-17(23)8-9-20-21(23)11-14-24(2)22(20)12-15-25(24,3)26/h8,16,18,20-22,26H,4-7,9-15H2,1-3H3/t20-,21+,22+,23+,24+,25+/m1/s1; Key:ZUBDXGHKAAMAAA-RFXJPFPRSA-N

Penmesterol (INN) (brand names Pandrocine, Testopan; former developmental code name RP-12222), or penmestrol, also known as 17α-methyltestosterone 3-cyclopentyl enol ether, is a synthetic, orally active anabolic-androgenic steroid (AAS) that was developed in the early 1960s. It is the 3-cyclopentyl enol ether of methyltestosterone.

== See also ==
- Methandriol
- Methyltestosterone 3-hexyl ether
- Propetandrol
