= ORG-2058 =

Chemical compound

Clinical data
- Other names: 16α-Ethyl-21-hydroxy-19-norprogesterone; 16α-Ethyl-21-hydroxy-19-norpregn-4-ene-3,20-dione

Identifiers
- IUPAC name: (8R,9S,10R,13S,14S,16R,17S)-16-ethyl-17-(2-hydroxyacetyl)-13-methyl-2,6,7,8,9,10,11,12,14,15,16,17-dodecahydro-1H-cyclopenta[a]phenanthren-3-one
- CAS Number: 24320-06-7
- PubChem CID: 119086
- ChemSpider: 106407
- UNII: 47DQ76SB3X
- ChEMBL: ChEMBL2311103

Chemical and physical data
- Formula: C_{22}H_{32}O_{3}
- Molar mass: 344.495 g·mol^{−1}
- 3D model (JSmol): Interactive image
- SMILES: CC[C@@H]1C[C@H]2[C@@H]3CCC4=CC(=O)CC[C@@H]4[C@H]3CC[C@@]2([C@H]1C(=O)CO)C
- InChI: InChI=1S/C22H32O3/c1-3-13-11-19-18-6-4-14-10-15(24)5-7-16(14)17(18)8-9-22(19,2)21(13)20(25)12-23/h10,13,16-19,21,23H,3-9,11-12H2,1-2H3/t13-,16+,17-,18-,19+,21-,22+/m1/s1; Key:IJLXLZGJDSJGIQ-BILPMHSYSA-N

ORG-2058, also known as 16α-ethyl-21-hydroxy-19-norprogesterone, is a progestin of the 19-norprogesterone group which was never marketed. It has high affinity for the progesterone receptor (775% of that of progesterone) and has been used in scientific research to study the role of the progesterone receptor in the body. The drug has no affinity for the estrogen receptor or the glucocorticoid receptor (less than 0.2% of the affinities of estradiol and dexamethasone, respectively) and has slight affinity for the mineralocorticoid receptor, but less than that of progesterone.

== See also ==
- Promegestone
