= Cyanomethyl =

Functional group

In organic chemistry, the term cyanomethyl (cyanide (N≡C) + methyl (CH_{3})) designates:

- A cyanomethyl group (N≡CCH_{2}–), a type of nitrile group
- The cyanomethyl radical (N≡CCH_{2}·)
- The cyanomethyl carbanion (N≡CCH_{2}^{−})

== See also ==
- Ethynyl
- Hydroxymethyl
- Trifluoromethyl
