= Testosterone caproate =

Chemical compound

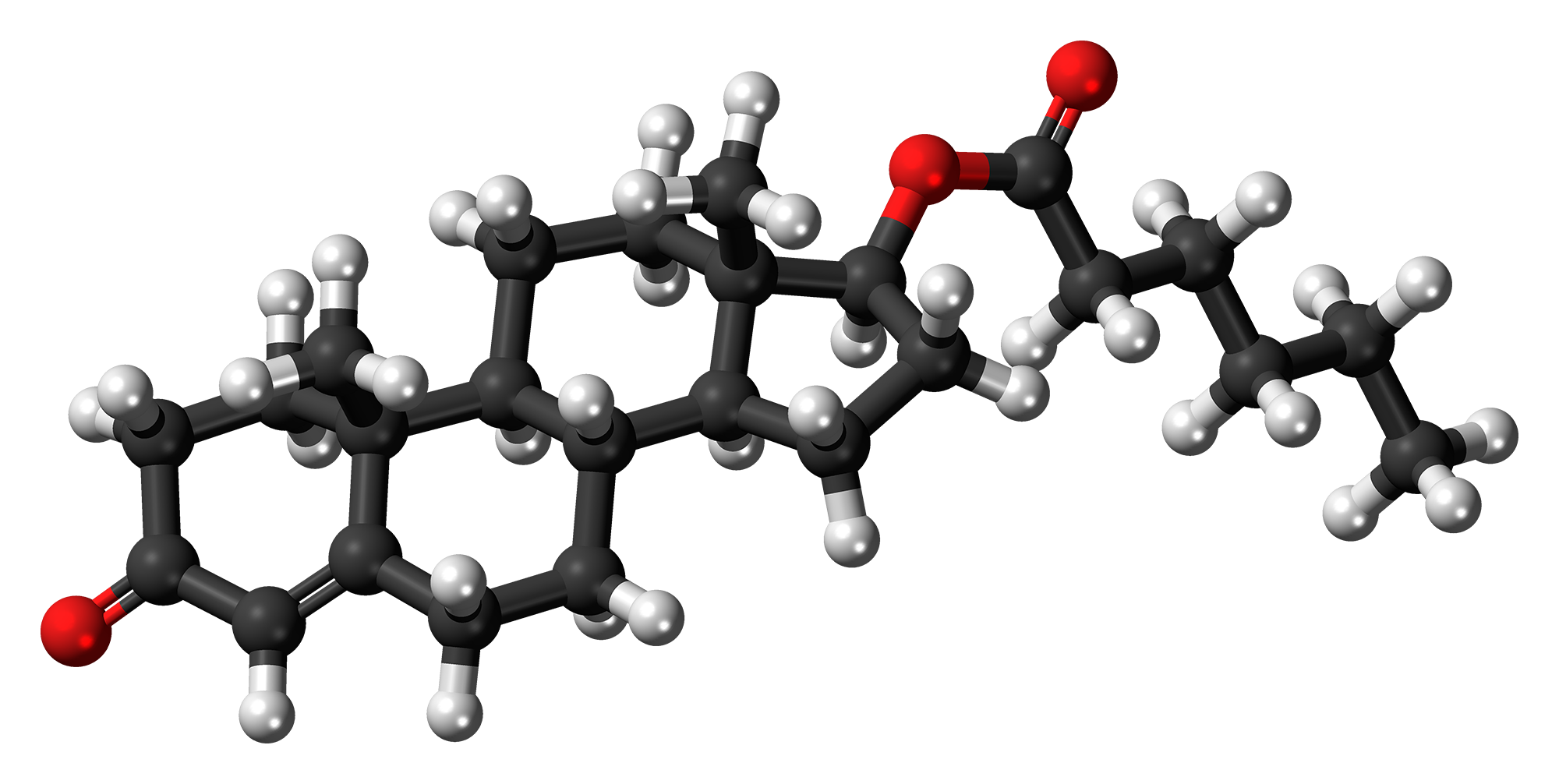

Clinical data
- Trade names: Omnadren 250
- Other names: TCa; Testosterone hexanoate; 17β-Hydroxyandrost-4-en-3-one hexanoate; 3-Oxoandrost-4-en-17β-yl hexanoate
- Routes of administration: Intramuscular injection

Identifiers
- IUPAC name: [(8R,9S,10R,13S,14S,17S)-10,13-dimethyl-3-oxo-1,2,6,7,8,9,11,12,14,15,16,17-dodecahydrocyclopenta[a]phenanthren-17-yl] hexanoate
- CAS Number: 10312-45-5
- PubChem CID: 112100
- ChemSpider: 100500
- UNII: 7CC0L7J83H
- CompTox Dashboard (EPA): DTXSID10908205
- ECHA InfoCard: 100.030.615

Chemical and physical data
- Formula: C_{25}H_{38}O_{3}
- Molar mass: 386.576 g·mol^{−1}
- 3D model (JSmol): Interactive image
- SMILES: CCCCCC(=O)O[C@H]1CC[C@@H]2[C@@]1(CC[C@H]3[C@H]2CCC4=CC(=O)CC[C@]34C)C
- InChI: InChI=1S/C25H38O3/c1-4-5-6-7-23(27)28-22-11-10-20-19-9-8-17-16-18(26)12-14-24(17,2)21(19)13-15-25(20,22)3/h16,19-22H,4-15H2,1-3H3/t19-,20-,21-,22-,24-,25-/m0/s1; Key:WIGTZVOQGIFMAV-BKWLFHPQSA-N

Testosterone caproate (TCa), also known as testosterone hexanoate, is an androgen and anabolic steroid and a testosterone ester that is no longer marketed. It was formerly available as a component of Omnadren 250, along with testosterone isocaproate, testosterone phenylpropionate, and testosterone propionate, but this formulation has since been discontinued.

Parenteral durations of androgens/anabolic steroids
Medication	Form	Major brand names	Duration
Testosterone	Aqueous suspension	Andronaq, Sterotate, Virosterone	2–3 days
Testosterone propionate	Oil solution	Androteston, Perandren, Testoviron	3–4 days
Testosterone phenylpropionate	Oil solution	Testolent	8 days
Testosterone isobutyrate	Aqueous suspension	Agovirin Depot, Perandren M	14 days
Mixed testosterone esters^{a}	Oil solution	Triolandren	10–20 days
Mixed testosterone esters^{b}	Oil solution	Testosid Depot	14–20 days
Testosterone enanthate	Oil solution	Delatestryl	14–28 days
Testosterone cypionate	Oil solution	Depovirin	14–28 days
Mixed testosterone esters^{c}	Oil solution	Sustanon 250	28 days
Testosterone undecanoate	Oil solution	Aveed, Nebido	100 days
Testosterone buciclate^{d}	Aqueous suspension	20 Aet-1, CDB-1781^{e}	90–120 days
Nandrolone phenylpropionate	Oil solution	Durabolin	10 days
Nandrolone decanoate	Oil solution	Deca Durabolin	21–28 days
Methandriol	Aqueous suspension	Notandron, Protandren	8 days
Methandriol bisenanthoyl acetate	Oil solution	Notandron Depot	16 days
Metenolone acetate	Oil solution	Primobolan	3 days
Metenolone enanthate	Oil solution	Primobolan Depot	14 days
Note: All are via i.m. injection. Footnotes: ^{a} = TP, TV, and TUe. ^{b} = TP and TKL. ^{c} = TP, TPP, TiCa, and TD. ^{d} = Studied but never marketed. ^{e} = Developmental code names. Sources: See template.

== Gallery ==
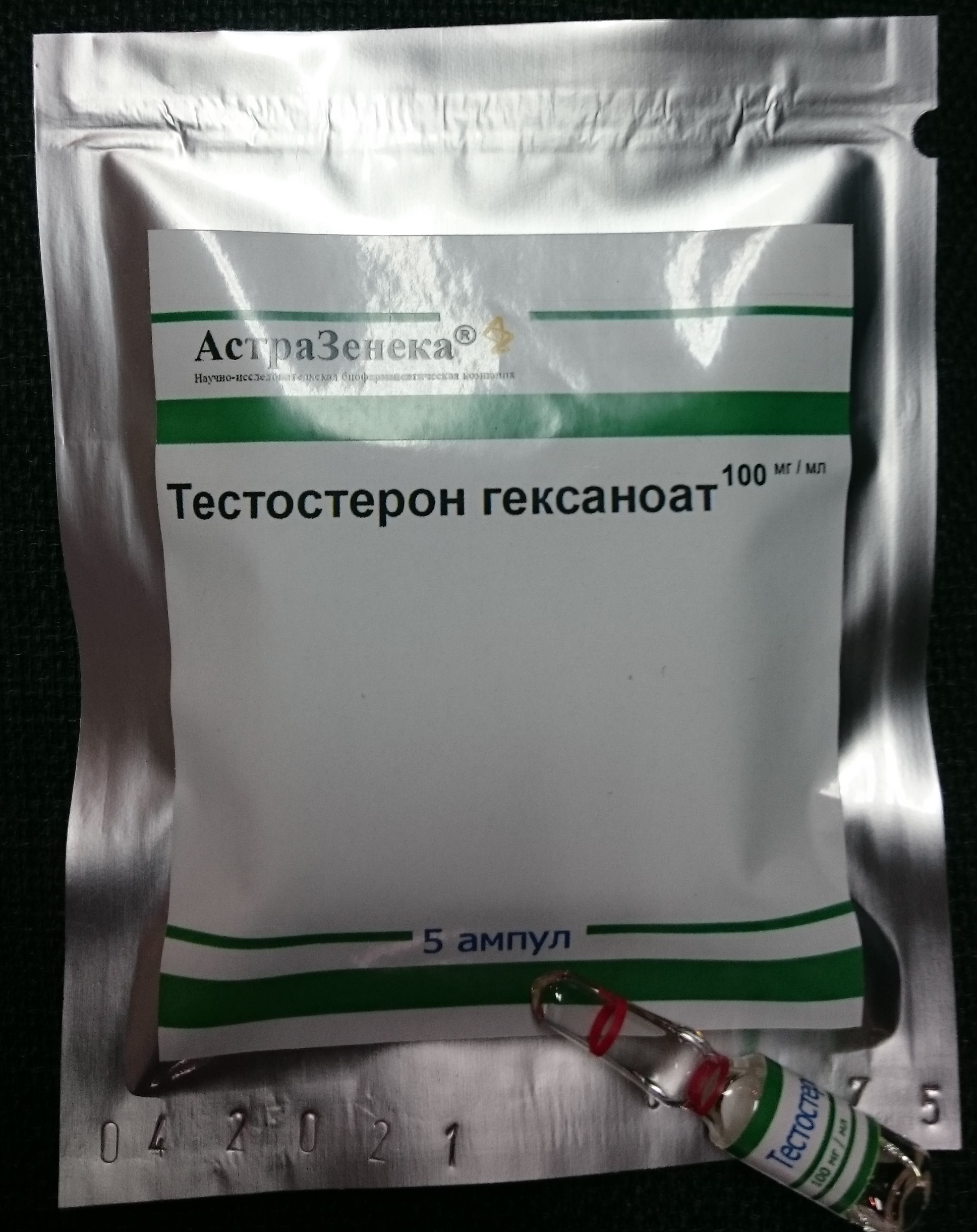
The Russian Testosterone Hexanoate 100 mg (front)

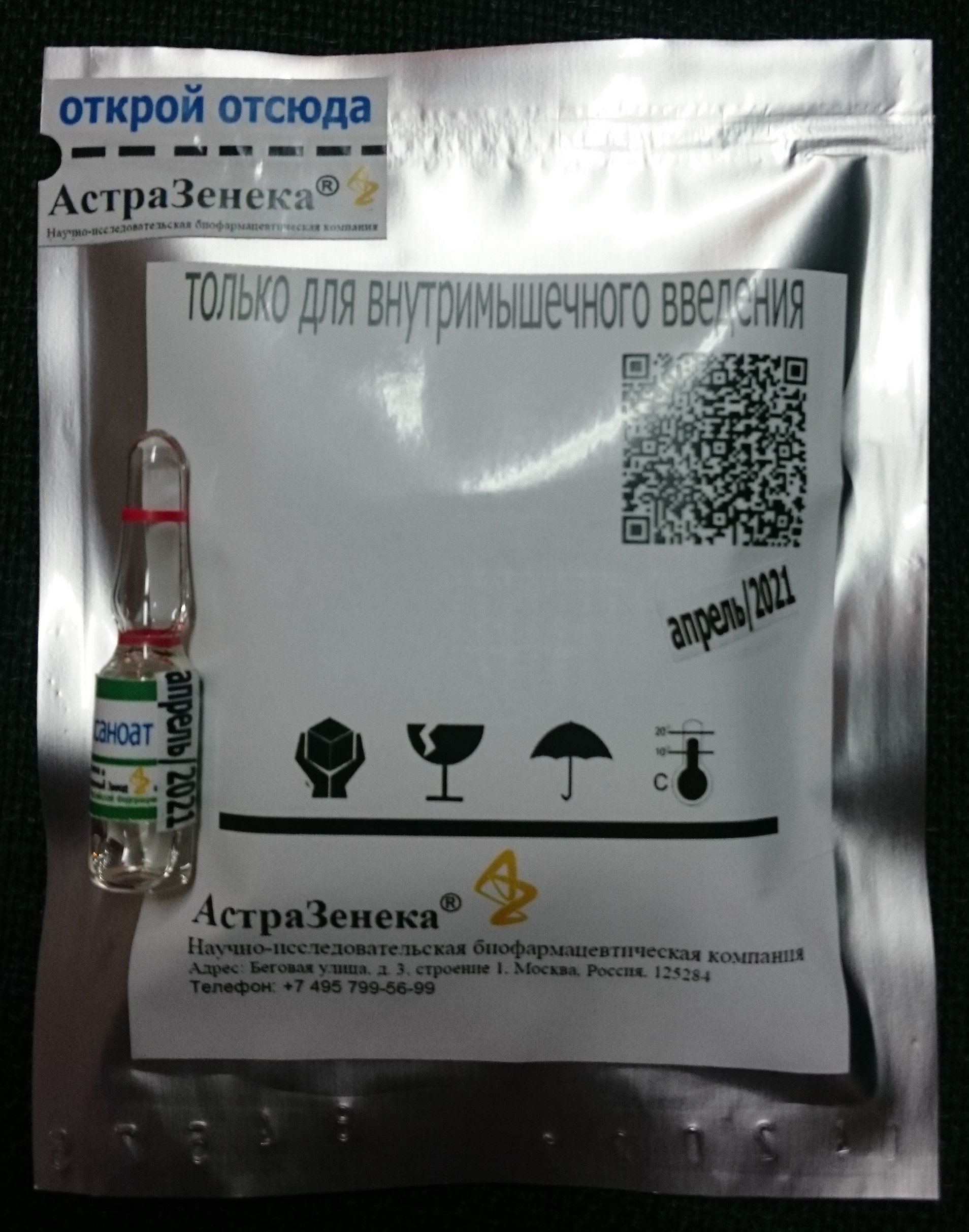
The Russian Testosterone Hexanoate 100 mg (back)

== See also ==
- List of androgen esters § Testosterone esters
- Estradiol dibutyrate/hydroxyprogesterone heptanoate/testosterone caproate
- Testosterone propionate/testosterone phenylpropionate/testosterone isocaproate/testosterone caproate
