= Testosterone propionate/testosterone phenylpropionate/testosterone isocaproate =

Combination drug

TP/TPP/TiC
Combination of
- Testosterone propionate: Androgen; Anabolic steroid
- Testosterone phenylpropionate: Androgen; Anabolic steroid
- Testosterone isocaproate: Androgen; Anabolic steroid

Clinical data
- Trade names: Sustanon 100
- Other names: TP/TPP/TiC
- Routes of administration: Intramuscular injection

Identifiers
- CAS Number: 200721-95-5

Testosterone propionate/testosterone phenylpropionate/testosterone isocaproate (TP/TPP/TiC), sold under the brand name Sustanon 100 (Organon), is an injectable combination medication of three testosterone esters, all of which are androgens/anabolic steroids. They include:

- 20 mg testosterone propionate
- 40 mg testosterone phenylpropionate
- 40 mg testosterone isocaproate

They are provided as an oil solution and are administered by intramuscular injection. The different testosterone esters provide for different elimination half-lives in the body. Esterification of testosterone provides for a sustained but non-linear release of testosterone hormone from the injection depot into the circulation.

The medication was a smaller dose than Sustanon 250 and was usually reserved for pediatric use.

Sustanon 100 has not been produced since 2009. Sustanon 100 is manufactured in India by Zydus.

Parenteral durations of androgens/anabolic steroids
Medication	Form	Major brand names	Duration
Testosterone	Aqueous suspension	Andronaq, Sterotate, Virosterone	2–3 days
Testosterone propionate	Oil solution	Androteston, Perandren, Testoviron	3–4 days
Testosterone phenylpropionate	Oil solution	Testolent	8 days
Testosterone isobutyrate	Aqueous suspension	Agovirin Depot, Perandren M	14 days
Mixed testosterone esters^{a}	Oil solution	Triolandren	10–20 days
Mixed testosterone esters^{b}	Oil solution	Testosid Depot	14–20 days
Testosterone enanthate	Oil solution	Delatestryl	14–28 days
Testosterone cypionate	Oil solution	Depovirin	14–28 days
Mixed testosterone esters^{c}	Oil solution	Sustanon 250	28 days
Testosterone undecanoate	Oil solution	Aveed, Nebido	100 days
Testosterone buciclate^{d}	Aqueous suspension	20 Aet-1, CDB-1781^{e}	90–120 days
Nandrolone phenylpropionate	Oil solution	Durabolin	10 days
Nandrolone decanoate	Oil solution	Deca Durabolin	21–28 days
Methandriol	Aqueous suspension	Notandron, Protandren	8 days
Methandriol bisenanthoyl acetate	Oil solution	Notandron Depot	16 days
Metenolone acetate	Oil solution	Primobolan	3 days
Metenolone enanthate	Oil solution	Primobolan Depot	14 days
Note: All are via i.m. injection. Footnotes: ^{a} = TP, TV, and TUe. ^{b} = TP and TKL. ^{c} = TP, TPP, TiCa, and TD. ^{d} = Studied but never marketed. ^{e} = Developmental code names. Sources: See template.

== See also ==
- Testosterone propionate/testosterone phenylpropionate/testosterone isocaproate/testosterone decanoate
- Testosterone propionate/testosterone phenylpropionate/testosterone isocaproate/testosterone caproate
- List of combined sex-hormonal preparations § Androgens
