= Testosterone propionate/testosterone phenylpropionate/testosterone isocaproate/testosterone caproate =

Combination drug

TP/TPP/TiC/TCa
Combination of
- Testosterone propionate: Androgen; Anabolic steroid
- Testosterone phenylpropionate: Androgen; Anabolic steroid
- Testosterone isocaproate: Androgen; Anabolic steroid
- Testosterone caproate: Androgen; Anabolic steroid

Clinical data
- Trade names: Omnadren, Omnadren 250
- Other names: TP/TPP/TiC/TCa
- Routes of administration: Intramuscular injection

Identifiers
- CAS Number: 200721-94-4

Testosterone propionate/testosterone phenylpropionate/testosterone isocaproate/testosterone caproate (TP/TPP/TiC/TCa), sold under the brand name Omnadren or Omnadren 250, is an injectable combination medication of four testosterone esters, all of which are androgens/anabolic steroids, which is no longer marketed. Its constituents included:

- Testosterone propionate (30 mg)
- Testosterone phenylpropionate (60 mg)
- Testosterone isocaproate (60 mg)
- Testosterone caproate (100 mg)

Parenteral durations of androgens/anabolic steroids
Medication	Form	Major brand names	Duration
Testosterone	Aqueous suspension	Andronaq, Sterotate, Virosterone	2–3 days
Testosterone propionate	Oil solution	Androteston, Perandren, Testoviron	3–4 days
Testosterone phenylpropionate	Oil solution	Testolent	8 days
Testosterone isobutyrate	Aqueous suspension	Agovirin Depot, Perandren M	14 days
Mixed testosterone esters^{a}	Oil solution	Triolandren	10–20 days
Mixed testosterone esters^{b}	Oil solution	Testosid Depot	14–20 days
Testosterone enanthate	Oil solution	Delatestryl	14–28 days
Testosterone cypionate	Oil solution	Depovirin	14–28 days
Mixed testosterone esters^{c}	Oil solution	Sustanon 250	28 days
Testosterone undecanoate	Oil solution	Aveed, Nebido	100 days
Testosterone buciclate^{d}	Aqueous suspension	20 Aet-1, CDB-1781^{e}	90–120 days
Nandrolone phenylpropionate	Oil solution	Durabolin	10 days
Nandrolone decanoate	Oil solution	Deca Durabolin	21–28 days
Methandriol	Aqueous suspension	Notandron, Protandren	8 days
Methandriol bisenanthoyl acetate	Oil solution	Notandron Depot	16 days
Metenolone acetate	Oil solution	Primobolan	3 days
Metenolone enanthate	Oil solution	Primobolan Depot	14 days
Note: All are via i.m. injection. Footnotes: ^{a} = TP, TV, and TUe. ^{b} = TP and TKL. ^{c} = TP, TPP, TiCa, and TD. ^{d} = Studied but never marketed. ^{e} = Developmental code names. Sources: See template.

== See also ==
- Testosterone propionate/testosterone phenylpropionate/testosterone isocaproate
- Testosterone propionate/testosterone phenylpropionate/testosterone isocaproate/testosterone decanoate
- List of combined sex-hormonal preparations § Androgens
