= C34H48O4 =

The molecular formula C_{34}H_{48}O_{4} (molar mass : 520.754 g/mol) may refer to:

- Estradiol dicypionate
- Testosterone hexyloxyphenylpropionate
