= C27H40O4 =

The molecular formula C_{27}H_{40}O_{4} (molar mass: 428.60 g/mol, exact mass: 428.2927 u) may refer to:

- AM-938
- Hydroxyprogesterone caproate (OHPC)
- Testosterone hexahydrobenzylcarbonate
