= Testosterone propionate/testosterone enanthate =

Combination drug

Combination of
- Testosterone propionate: Androgen
- Testosterone enanthate: Androgen

Clinical data
- Trade names: Testoviron Depot
- Other names: TP/TE
- Routes of administration: Intramuscular injection

Identifiers
- CAS Number: 58-18-4
- ChemSpider: None

Testosterone propionate/testosterone enanthate (TE/TP), sold under the brand name Testoviron depot, is an oil-based mixture of testosterone esters for depot intramuscular injection which is marketed in Europe. Its constituents include:

- Testosterone propionate (TP) (20 mg, 25 mg, or 50 mg)
- Testosterone enanthate (TE) (55 mg, 110 mg, or 200 mg)

== See also ==
- List of combined sex-hormonal preparations § Androgens
- Deposterona
- Omnadren
- Sustanon (disambiguation)
