= C25H32O4 =

The molecular formula C_{25}H_{32}O_{4} (molar mass: 396.52 g/mol, exact mass: 396.2301 u) may refer to:

- Anthracimycin
- Melengestrol acetate (MLGA)
- Nandrolone furylpropionate (NFP)
