= List of androgen esters =

Testosterone, the base androgen of most androgen esters.

This is a list of androgen esters, including esters (as well as ethers) of natural androgens like testosterone and dihydrotestosterone (DHT) and synthetic anabolic–androgenic steroids (AAS) like nandrolone (19-nortestosterone).

== Esters of natural AAS ==
=== Testosterone esters ===
==== Marketed ====
Many esters of testosterone have been marketed, including the following major esters:

- Testosterone caproate (component of Omnadren and Triormon Depositum)
- Testosterone cypionate (Depo-Testosterone, numerous others)
- Testosterone decanoate (component of Sustanon 250)
- Testosterone enanthate (Delatestryl, numerous others) (component of Testoviron Depot)
- Testosterone isobutyrate (Agovirin-Depot, Perandren M, Testocryst, Virex-Cryst; component of Femandren M/Folivirin)
- Testosterone isocaproate (component of Omnadren, Sustanon 100, and Sustanon 250)
- Testosterone phenylpropionate (component of Omnadren, Sustanon 100, and Sustanon 250)
- Testosterone propionate (Testoviron, numerous others) (component of Omnadren, Sustanon 100, Sustanon 250, and Testoviron Depot)
- Testosterone undecanoate (Aveed, Andriol, Nebido, Jatenzo, numerous others)

And the following less commonly used esters:

- Testosterone acetate (Aceto-Sterandryl, Aceto-Testoviron, Amolisin, Androtest A, Deposteron, Farmatest, Perandrone A)
- Testosterone cyclohexylpropionate (Andromar, Femolone, Telipex Retard; component of Trioestrine Retard)
- Testosterone enantate benzilic acid hydrazone (component of Climacteron)
- Testosterone furoate (Furotest)
- Testosterone hexahydrobenzoate (Sterandryl Retard; component of Trinestril AP)
- Testosterone hexahydrobenzylcarbonate (Lontanyl)
- Testosterone hexyloxyphenylpropionate (Andradurin)
- Testosterone ketolaurate (Androdurin; component of Testosid-Depot and Klimanosid R-Depot)
- Testosterone nicotinate (Bolfortan, Linobol)
- Testosterone phenylacetate (Perandren, Androject)
- Testosterone phosphate (Telipex Aquosum)
- Testosterone undecylenate (component of Durasteron and Triolandren)
- Testosterone valerate (component of Deposterona and Triolandren)

==== Never marketed ====
The following major testosterone ester has not been marketed:

- Testosterone buciclate (20 Aet-1, CDB-1781) – a very long-acting testosterone ester that was under development but ultimately did not reach the market

And the following less commonly known testosterone esters have also not been marketed:

- Polytestosterone phloretin phosphate
- Testosterone 17β-(1-((5-(aminosulfonyl)-2-pyridinyl)carbonyl)-L-proline) (EC586)
- Testosterone acetate butyrate
- Testosterone acetate propionate
- Testosterone benzoate
- Testosterone butyrate
- Testosterone diacetate
- Testosterone dipropionate
- Testosterone formate
- Testosterone isovalerate
- Testosterone palmitate
- Testosterone phenylbutyrate
- Testosterone stearate
- Testosterone succinate
- Testosterone sulfate

=== Dihydrotestosterone esters ===
==== Marketed ====
Several esters of dihydrotestosterone (DHT; androstanolone, stanolone) have also been marketed, including the following:

- Androstanolone benzoate (Ermalone-Amp, Hermalone, Sarcosan)
- Androstanolone enanthate (Anaboleen Depot)
- Androstanolone propionate (Pesomax)
- Androstanolone valerate (Apeton)

==== Never marketed ====
The following esters of DHT have not been marketed:

- Dihydrotestosterone acetate
- Dihydrotestosterone butyrate
- Dihydrotestosterone formate
- Dihydrotestosterone undecanoate

Testifenon (chlorphenacyl DHT ester) is a nitrogen mustard ester of DHT that was developed as a cytostatic antineoplastic agent but was never marketed.

=== Esters of other natural AAS ===
==== Marketed ====
The following esters of other natural AAS have been marketed:

- Androstenediol dipropionate (Bisexovister, Bisexovis, Ginandrin, Stenandiol)
- Prasterone enantate (DHEA enantate) (Gynodian Depot (in combination with estradiol valerate))
- Prasterone sulfate (DHEA sulfate) (Astenile, Mylis, Teloin)

==== Never marketed ====
And the following have not been marketed:

- Androstenediol 3β-acetate
- Androstenediol 3β-acetate 17β-benzoate
- Androstenediol 17β-acetate
- Androstenediol diacetate

Sturamustine is a nitrosourea ester of dehydroepiandrosterone (DHEA) that was developed as a cytostatic antineoplastic agent but was never marketed.

=== Ethers of natural AAS ===
==== Marketed ====
Although not esters, the following ethers of natural AAS have been marketed as well:

- Cloxotestosterone acetate (Caprosem) – the 17-O-chloral hemiacetal acetate ether of testosterone

==== Never marketed ====
And the following have not been marketed:

- Cloxotestosterone – the 17-O-chloral hemiacetal ether of testosterone
- Silandrone (SC-16148) – the 17-O-trimethylsilyl ether of testosterone

== Esters of synthetic AAS ==
=== Methandriol esters ===
==== Marketed ====
- Methandriol bisenanthoyl acetate (Notandron-Depot)
- Methandriol dipropionate (Arbolic, Durabolic, Or-Bolic, Probolik, Protabolin)
- Methandriol propionate (Metilbisexovis)

==== Never marketed ====
- Methandriol diacetate

=== Nandrolone esters ===
==== Marketed ====
Many esters of the synthetic AAS nandrolone (19-nortestosterone) have been marketed, including the following major esters:

- Nandrolone decanoate (Deca-Durabolin, others)
- Nandrolone phenylpropionate (Durabolin, others)

And the following less commonly used esters:

- Nandrolone caproate (Anabolin Depot)
- Nandrolone cyclohexanecarboxylate (Nor-Durandron, Norlongandron)
- Nandrolone cyclohexylpropionate (Andol, Fherbolico, Megabolin, Megabolin Retar, Pluropon, Proteron-Depot, Sanabolicum)
- Nandrolone cypionate (Anabo, Depo-Nortestonate, Dynabol, Nortestrionate, Pluropon, Sterocrinolo)
- Nandrolone furylpropionate (Demelon)
- Nandrolone hexyloxyphenylpropionate (Anador, Anadur, Anadurine)
- Nandrolone hydrogen succinate (Anabolico, Menidrabol)
- Nandrolone laurate (Clinibolin, Fortadex, Laurabolin)
- Nandrolone propionate (Anabolicus, Nor-Anabol, Nortesto, Norbyol 19, Pondus, Testobolin)
- Nandrolone sulfate (Keratyl, Nandrol, Nandain, Colirio Ocul Nandrol)
- Nandrolone undecanoate (Dynabolin, Dynabolon, Psychobolan)

==== Never marketed ====
The following nandrolone esters exist but were never marketed:

- Bolmantalate (nandrolone 17β-adamantoate)
- Nandrolone acetate
- Nandrolone benzoate
- Nandrolone cyclotate
- Nandrolone enanthate
- Nandrolone formate
- Nandrolone nonanoate

LS-1727 is a nitrosocarbamate ester of nandrolone that was developed as a cytostatic antineoplastic agent but was never marketed.

=== Trenbolone esters ===
==== Marketed ====
A few esters of the synthetic AAS trenbolone have been marketed, including the following esters:

- Trenbolone acetate (Revalor, Finaplix, Finajet)
- Trenbolone hexahydrobenzylcarbonate (Parabolan, Hexabolan)

==== Never marketed ====
The following trenbolone esters exist but were never marketed:

- Trenbolone enanthate
- Trenbolone undecanoate

=== Esters of other synthetic AAS ===
==== Marketed ====
Many esters of other synthetic AAS have been marketed as well, including the following:

- Bolandiol dipropionate (Anabiol, Storinal)
- Bolazine capronate (bolazine caproate) (Roxilon Inject)
- Boldenone acetate (Equilon 100)
- Boldenone cypionate (Equilon 100)
- Boldenone propionate (Equilon 100)
- Boldenone undecylenate (boldenone undecenoate) (Boldane, Equilon 100, Equipoise, Parenabol, Vebonol, others)
- Clostebol acetate (Macrobin, Steranabol, Alfa-Trofodermin, Megagrisevit)
- Clostebol caproate (Macrobin-Depot)
- Clostebol propionate (Yonchlon)
- Drostanolone propionate (Masteron, Drolban, Masteril, Mastisol, Metormon, Permastril)
- Metenolone acetate (Primobolan, Primobolan S, Primonabol, Nibal)
- Metenolone enantate (Primobolan Depot)
- Norclostebol acetate (Anabol 4-19)
- Oxabolone cipionate (Steranabol Depo, Steranabol Ritardo)
- Propetandrol (norethandrolone 3β-propionate) (Solevar)
- Stenbolone acetate (Stenobolone, Anatrofin)

==== Never marketed ====
Whereas the following have not been marketed:

- 11β-Methyl-19-nortestosterone dodecylcarbonate
- Dimethandrolone buciclate
- Dimethandrolone dodecylcarbonate
- Dimethandrolone undecanoate
- Mesterolone cypionate
- Nisterime acetate
- Trestolone acetate
- Trestolone enantate

=== Ethers of synthetic AAS ===
==== Marketed ====
Although not esters, the following ethers of synthetic AAS have been marketed as well:

- Mepitiostane (Thioderon) – 17β-(1-methyloxycyclopentyl) ether of epitiostanol
- Methyltestosterone 3-hexyl ether (Androgenol, Enoltestovis, Enoltestovister) – 3-hexyl enol ether of methyltestosterone
- Penmesterol (penmestrol) (Pandrocine, Testopan) – 3-cyclopentyl enol ether of methyltestosterone
- Quinbolone (Anabolicum, Anabolvis) – 17β-cyclopentenyl enol ether of boldenone (Δ^{1}-testosterone)

==== Never marketed ====
And the following have not been marketed:

- Mesabolone – 17β-(1-methyloxycyclohexyl) ether of 1-testosterone (dihydroboldenone)
- Methoxydienone (methoxygonadiene) – 3-methyl ether of 17-dehydro-18-methyl-19-nor-δ^{2,5(10)}-testosterone
- Prostanozol – 17β-tetrahydropyran ether of the 17α-demethylated analogue of stanozolol

== See also ==
- List of androgens/anabolic steroids
- List of estrogen esters
- List of progestogen esters
- List of corticosteroid esters
