= C24H30O4 =

The molecular formula C_{24}H_{30}O_{4} (molar mass: 382.500 g/mol) may refer to:

- 3,8-Dihydrodiligustilide
- Hexestrol dipropionate
- Methenmadinone acetate
- Testosterone furoate
