= Nandrolone propionate =

Chemical compound

Clinical data
- Trade names: Anabolicus, Nor-Anabol, Nortesto, Norybol-19, Pondus, Testobolin
- Other names: Nandrolone propanoate; 19-Nortestosterone 17β-propionate
- Routes of administration: Intramuscular injection
- Drug class: Androgen; Anabolic steroid; Androgen ester; Progestogen

Identifiers
- IUPAC name: [(8R,9S,10R,13S,14S,17S)-13-methyl-3-oxo-2,6,7,8,9,10,11,12,14,15,16,17-dodecahydro-1H-cyclopenta[a]phenanthren-17-yl] propanoate
- CAS Number: 7207-92-3
- PubChem CID: 111273
- ChemSpider: 99850
- UNII: M86G89RH16
- CompTox Dashboard (EPA): DTXSID80992797
- ECHA InfoCard: 100.027.807

Chemical and physical data
- Formula: C_{21}H_{30}O_{3}
- Molar mass: 330.468 g·mol^{−1}
- 3D model (JSmol): Interactive image
- SMILES: CCC(=O)O[C@H]1CC[C@@H]2[C@@]1(CC[C@H]3[C@H]2CCC4=CC(=O)CC[C@H]34)C
- InChI: InChI=1S/C21H30O3/c1-3-20(23)24-19-9-8-18-17-6-4-13-12-14(22)5-7-15(13)16(17)10-11-21(18,19)2/h12,15-19H,3-11H2,1-2H3/t15-,16+,17+,18-,19-,21-/m0/s1; Key:LGRKCTFWUWAKON-RRFJAZBJSA-N

Nandrolone propionate (brand names Anabolicus, Nor-Anabol, Nortesto, Norybol-19, Pondus, Testobolin), or nandrolone propanoate, also known as 19-nortestosterone 17β-propionate, is a synthetic androgen and anabolic steroid and nandrolone ester that is or has been marketed in Spain.

Relative affinities (%) of nandrolone and related steroids
Compound	PR	AR	ER	GR	MR	SHBG	CBG
Nandrolone	20	154–155	<0.1	0.5	1.6	1–16	0.1
Testosterone	1.0–1.2	100	<0.1	0.17	0.9	19–82	3–8
Estradiol	2.6	7.9	100	0.6	0.13	8.7–12	<0.1
Notes: Values are percentages (%). Reference ligands (100%) were progesterone for the PR, testosterone for the AR, estradiol for the ER, dexamethasone for the GR, aldosterone for the MR, dihydrotestosterone for SHBG, and cortisol for CBG. Sources: See template.

== See also ==
- List of androgen esters § Nandrolone esters
