= Dihydrotestosterone formate =

Chemical compound

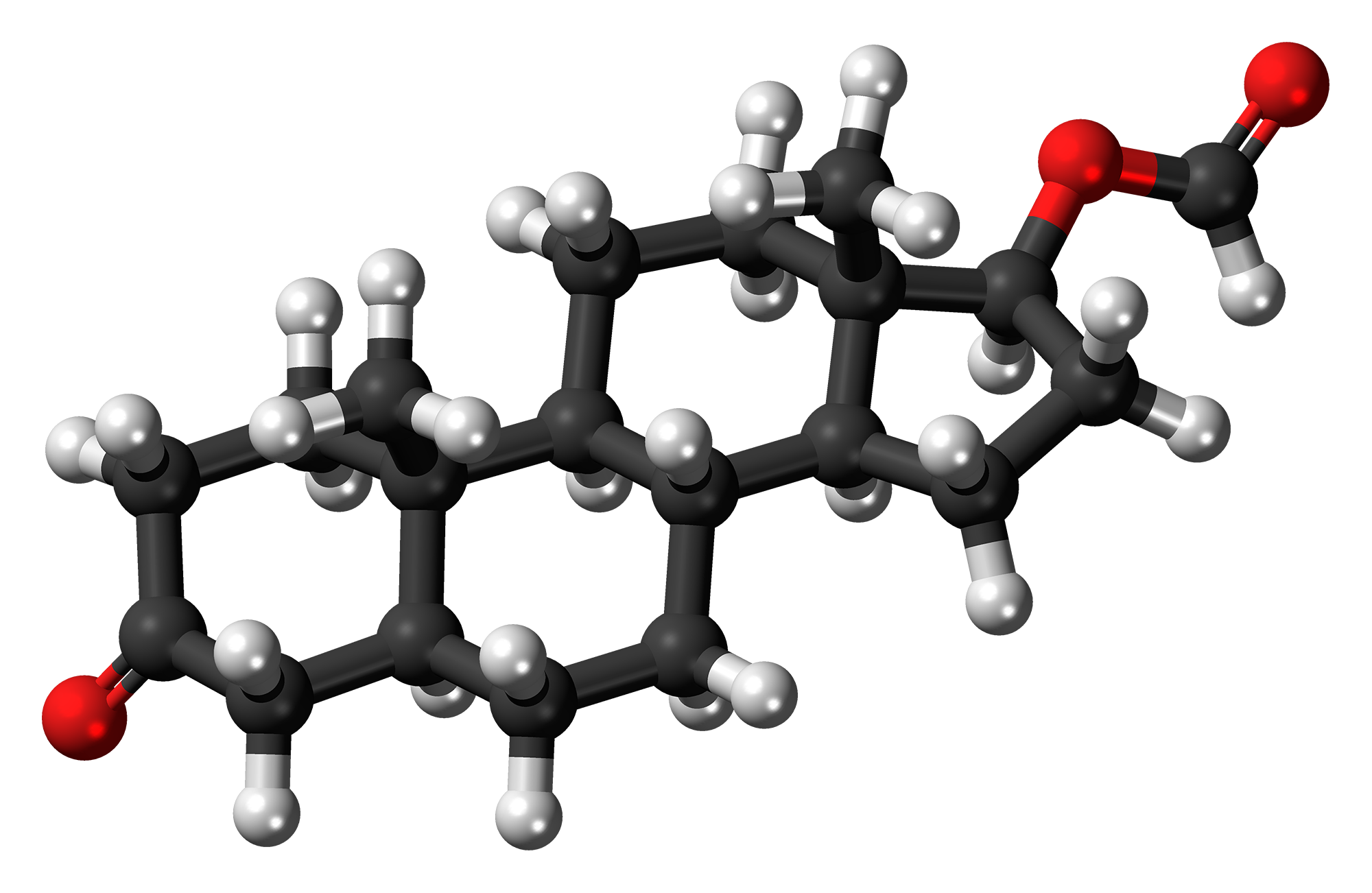

Clinical data
- Other names: Androstanolone formate; Stanolone formate; 5α-Dihydrotestosterone 17β-formate; 17β‐(Formyloxy)‐5α‐androstane‐3‐one
- Routes of administration: Intramuscular injection

Identifiers
- IUPAC name: [(5S,8R,9S,10S,13S,14S,17S)-10,13-dimethyl-3-oxo-1,2,4,5,6,7,8,9,11,12,14,15,16,17-tetradecahydrocyclopenta[a]phenanthren-17-yl] formate
- CAS Number: 4589-90-6
- PubChem CID: 20837715
- ChemSpider: 20141229
- UNII: XLP4J4HXT5
- CompTox Dashboard (EPA): DTXSID401047942

Chemical and physical data
- Formula: C_{20}H_{30}O_{3}
- Molar mass: 318.457 g·mol^{−1}
- 3D model (JSmol): Interactive image
- SMILES: C[C@]12CCC(=O)C[C@@H]1CC[C@@H]3[C@@H]2CC[C@]4([C@H]3CC[C@@H]4OC=O)C
- InChI: InChI=1S/C20H30O3/c1-19-9-7-14(22)11-13(19)3-4-15-16-5-6-18(23-12-21)20(16,2)10-8-17(15)19/h12-13,15-18H,3-11H2,1-2H3/t13-,15-,16-,17-,18-,19-,20-/m0/s1; Key:ZQSXNBHXKJQHBH-VHUDCFPWSA-N

Dihydrotestosterone formate, also known as androstanolone formate or stanolone formate, as well as 5α-dihydrotestosterone 17β-formate, is a synthetic androgen and anabolic steroid and a dihydrotestosterone ester that was never marketed.

== See also ==
- List of androgen esters § Dihydrotestosterone esters
