= Dihydrotestosterone undecanoate =

Chemical compound

Clinical data
- Other names: DHTU; 5α-Dihydrotestosterone 17β-undecanoate; Androstanolone undecanoate; Stanolone undecanoate; 5α-Androstan-17β-ol-3-one 17β-undecanoate; 3-Oxo-5α-androstan-17β-yl undecanoate
- Routes of administration: By mouth
- Drug class: Androgen; Anabolic steroid; Androgen ester

Identifiers
- IUPAC name: [(5S,8R,9S,10S,13S,14S,17S)-10,13-Dimethyl-3-oxo-1,2,4,5,6,7,8,9,11,12,14,15,16,17-tetradecahydrocyclopenta[a]phenanthren-17-yl] undecanoate
- CAS Number: 6804-12-2
- PubChem CID: 56614500
- ChemSpider: 31046138
- UNII: 8DVD393EG2
- CompTox Dashboard (EPA): DTXSID90718066

Chemical and physical data
- Formula: C_{30}H_{50}O_{3}
- Molar mass: 458.727 g·mol^{−1}
- 3D model (JSmol): Interactive image
- SMILES: CCCCCCCCCCC(=O)O[C@H]1CC[C@@H]2[C@@]1(CC[C@H]3[C@H]2CC[C@@H]4[C@@]3(CCC(=O)C4)C)C
- InChI: InChI=1S/C30H50O3/c1-4-5-6-7-8-9-10-11-12-28(32)33-27-16-15-25-24-14-13-22-21-23(31)17-19-29(22,2)26(24)18-20-30(25,27)3/h22,24-27H,4-21H2,1-3H3/t22-,24-,25-,26-,27-,29-,30-/m0/s1; Key:AOQIVBOEDICQDB-KNWHVVHCSA-N

Dihydrotestosterone undecanoate (DHTU), also known as androstanolone undecanoate or stanolone undecanoate, is a synthetic androgen and anabolic steroid (AAS) which was never marketed. It is an androgen ester; specifically, it is the C17β undecanoate (undecylate) ester of dihydrotestosterone (DHT). DHTU is a prodrug of DHT. Similarly to testosterone undecanoate (TU), DHTU is orally active. It occurs as an important active metabolite of oral TU. The 5α-reductase inhibitor finasteride in combination with oral TU has no effect on the first-pass transformation of TU into DHTU or DHT, probably because of its unique lymphatic route of absorption. Oral DHTU may be absorbed by the lymphatic system similarly to TU, and this may explain its oral bioavailability.

== See also ==
- List of androgen esters § Dihydrotestosterone esters
- 3α-Hydroxysteroid dehydrogenase
