= Nandrolone formate =

Chemical compound

Clinical data
- Other names: Nandrolone carboxylate; Nandrolone methanoate; 19-Nortestosterone 17β-formate; Estr-4-en-17β-ol-3-one 17β-formate
- Routes of administration: Intramuscular injection
- Drug class: Androgen; Anabolic steroid; Androgen ester; Progestogen

Identifiers
- IUPAC name: [(8R,9S,10R,13S,14S,17S)-13-methyl-3-oxo-2,6,7,8,9,10,11,12,14,15,16,17-dodecahydro-1H-cyclopenta[a]phenanthren-17-yl] formate
- CAS Number: 38937-24-5
- ChemSpider: 58190210
- UNII: TVJ7JK7UHZ

Chemical and physical data
- Formula: C_{19}H_{26}O_{3}
- Molar mass: 302.414 g·mol^{−1}
- 3D model (JSmol): Interactive image
- SMILES: C[C@]12CC[C@H]3[C@@H](CCC4=CC(=O)CC[C@H]34)[C@@H]1CC[C@@H]2OC=O
- InChI: InChI=1S/C19H26O3/c1-19-9-8-15-14-5-3-13(21)10-12(14)2-4-16(15)17(19)6-7-18(19)22-11-20/h10-11,14-18H,2-9H2,1H3/t14-,15+,16+,17-,18-,19-/m0/s1; Key:VTJPCIHYJUPQQW-ZOFHRBRSSA-N

Nandrolone formate, also known as nandrolone carboxylate or nandrolone methanoate, as well as 19-nortestosterone 17β-formate or estr-4-en-17β-ol-3-one 17β-formate, is a synthetic, injected anabolic–androgenic steroid (AAS) and a derivative of 19-nortestosterone (nandrolone) that was never marketed. It is an androgen ester – specifically, the C17β formate ester of nandrolone.

Relative affinities (%) of nandrolone and related steroids
Compound	PR	AR	ER	GR	MR	SHBG	CBG
Nandrolone	20	154–155	<0.1	0.5	1.6	1–16	0.1
Testosterone	1.0–1.2	100	<0.1	0.17	0.9	19–82	3–8
Estradiol	2.6	7.9	100	0.6	0.13	8.7–12	<0.1
Notes: Values are percentages (%). Reference ligands (100%) were progesterone for the PR, testosterone for the AR, estradiol for the ER, dexamethasone for the GR, aldosterone for the MR, dihydrotestosterone for SHBG, and cortisol for CBG. Sources: See template.

== See also ==
- List of androgen esters § Nandrolone esters
