= Dihydrotestosterone butyrate =

Chemical compound

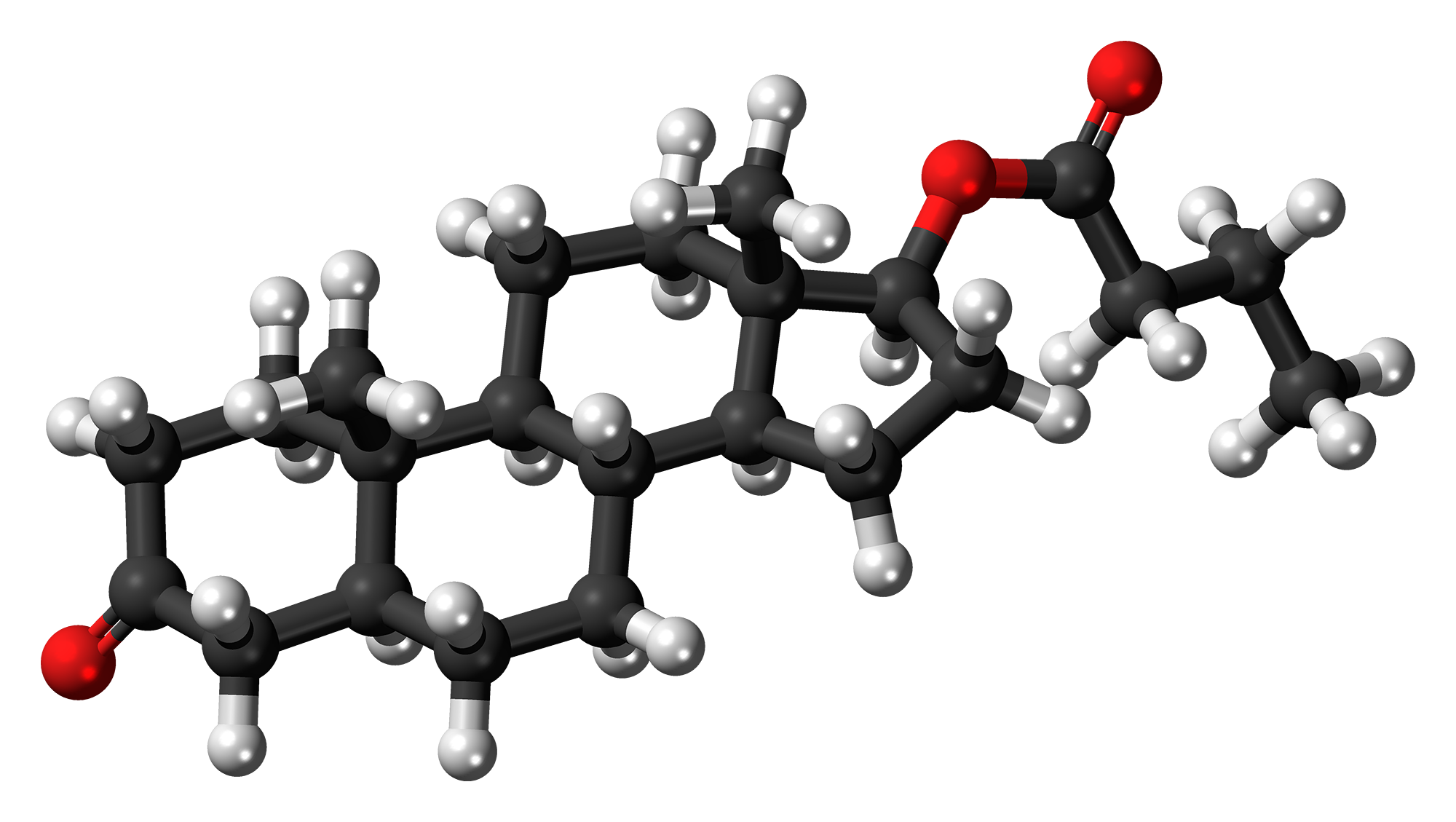

Clinical data
- Other names: Androstanolone butyrate; Stanolone butyrate; 5α-Dihydrotestosterone 17β-butanoate; 17β-(1-Oxobutoxy)-5α-androstan-3-one
- Routes of administration: Intramuscular injection

Identifiers
- IUPAC name: [(5S,8R,9S,10S,13S,14S,17S)-10,13-dimethyl-3-oxo-1,2,4,5,6,7,8,9,11,12,14,15,16,17-tetradecahydrocyclopenta[a]phenanthren-17-yl] butanoate
- CAS Number: 18069-66-4
- PubChem CID: 20837712
- ChemSpider: 4933663
- UNII: 9V6NK54583
- CompTox Dashboard (EPA): DTXSID701047941

Chemical and physical data
- Formula: C_{23}H_{36}O_{3}
- Molar mass: 360.538 g·mol^{−1}
- 3D model (JSmol): Interactive image
- SMILES: CCCC(=O)O[C@H]1CC[C@@H]2[C@@]1(CC[C@H]3[C@H]2CC[C@@H]4[C@@]3(CCC(=O)C4)C)C
- InChI: InChI=1S/C23H36O3/c1-4-5-21(25)26-20-9-8-18-17-7-6-15-14-16(24)10-12-22(15,2)19(17)11-13-23(18,20)3/h15,17-20H,4-14H2,1-3H3/t15-,17-,18-,19-,20-,22-,23-/m0/s1; Key:RRZYEXJGOQLDMJ-VJYMJRGRSA-N

Dihydrotestosterone butyrate, also known as androstanolone butyrate or stanolone butyrate, as well as 5α-dihydrotestosterone 17β-butanoate, is a synthetic androgen and anabolic steroid and a dihydrotestosterone ester that was never marketed.

== See also ==
- List of androgen esters § Dihydrotestosterone esters
