= Testosterone formate =

Chemical compound

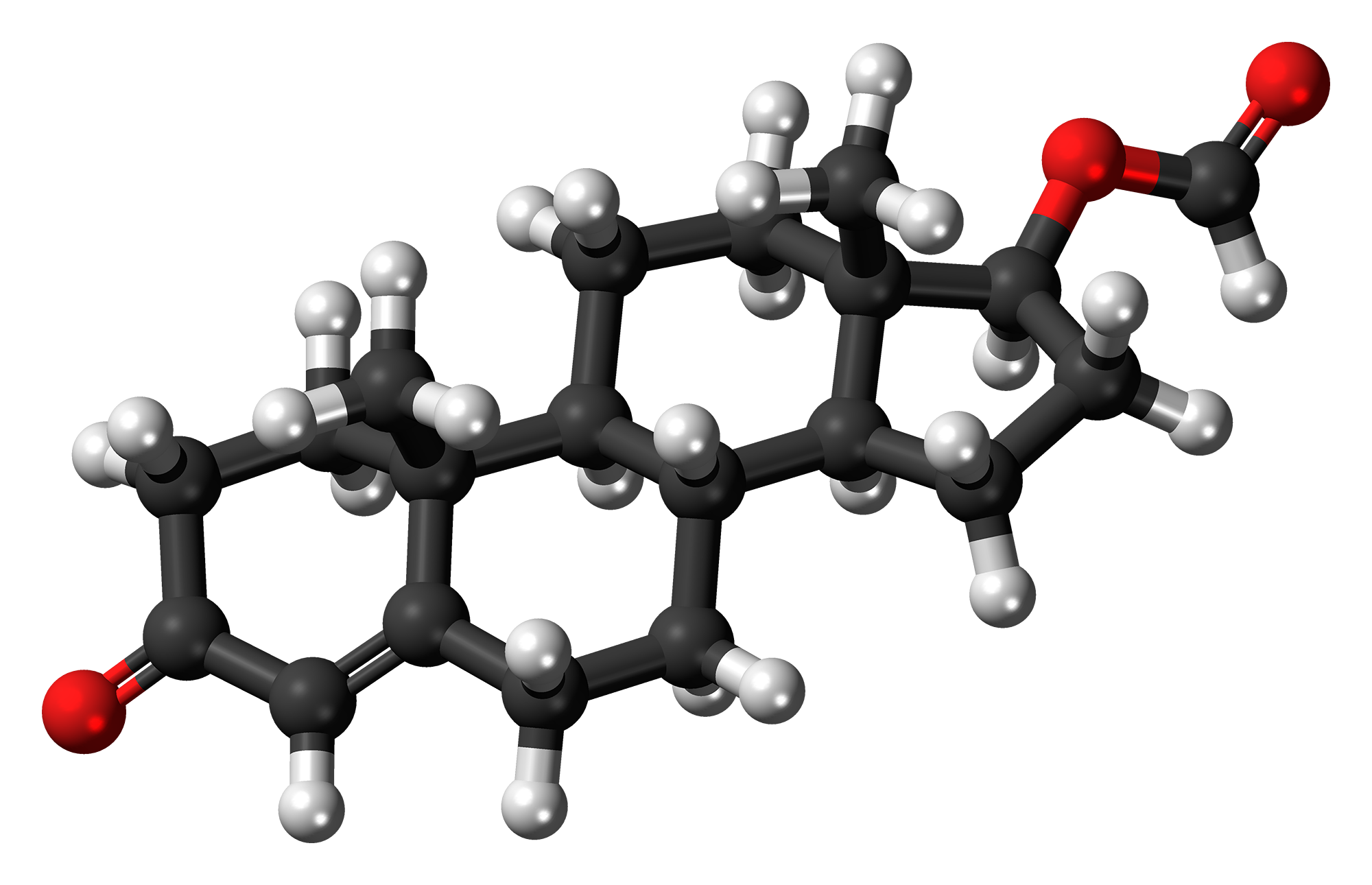

Clinical data
- Other names: Testosterone carboxylate; Testosterone methanoate

Identifiers
- IUPAC name: [(8R,9S,10R,13S,14S,17S)-10,13-Dimethyl-3-oxo-1,2,6,7,8,9,11,12,14,15,16,17-dodecahydrocyclopenta[a]phenanthren-17-yl] formate
- CAS Number: 3129-42-8
- PubChem CID: 151084
- ChemSpider: 133166
- CompTox Dashboard (EPA): DTXSID80953328

Chemical and physical data
- Formula: C_{20}H_{28}O_{3}
- Molar mass: 316.441 g·mol^{−1}
- 3D model (JSmol): Interactive image
- SMILES: C[C@]12CC[C@H]3[C@H]([C@@H]1CC[C@@H]2OC=O)CCC4=CC(=O)CC[C@]34C
- InChI: InChI=1S/C20H28O3/c1-19-9-7-14(22)11-13(19)3-4-15-16-5-6-18(23-12-21)20(16,2)10-8-17(15)19/h11-12,15-18H,3-10H2,1-2H3/t15-,16-,17-,18-,19-,20-/m0/s1; Key:LMUMOFOWZKACOU-RABCQHRBSA-N

Testosterone formate, also known as testosterone carboxylate or testosterone methanoate, as well as androst-4-en-17β-ol-3-one 17β-formate, is a synthetic, steroidal androgen and an androgen ester – specifically, the C17β formate ester of testosterone – which was first synthesized in the 1930s and was never marketed.

== See also ==
- List of androgen esters § Testosterone esters
