= Androstenediol 3β-acetate =

Chemical compound

Clinical data
- Other names: Androstenediol 3-acetate; 5-Androstenediol 3β-acetate; Androst-5-ene-3β,17β-diol 3β-acetate

Identifiers
- IUPAC name: [(3S,8R,9S,10R,13S,14S,17S)-17-Hydroxy-10,13-dimethyl-2,3,4,7,8,9,11,12,14,15,16,17-dodecahydro-1H-cyclopenta[a]phenanthren-3-yl] acetate
- CAS Number: 1639-43-6
- PubChem CID: 102150
- ChemSpider: 92284
- UNII: D4E4G12S6G
- CompTox Dashboard (EPA): DTXSID201043156
- ECHA InfoCard: 100.015.166

Chemical and physical data
- Formula: C_{21}H_{32}O_{3}
- Molar mass: 332.484 g·mol^{−1}
- 3D model (JSmol): Interactive image
- SMILES: CC(=O)O[C@H]1CC[C@@]2([C@H]3CC[C@]4([C@H]([C@@H]3CC=C2C1)CC[C@@H]4O)C)C
- InChI: InChI=1S/C21H32O3/c1-13(22)24-15-8-10-20(2)14(12-15)4-5-16-17-6-7-19(23)21(17,3)11-9-18(16)20/h4,15-19,23H,5-12H2,1-3H3/t15-,16-,17-,18-,19-,20-,21-/m0/s1; Key:OQHMNEGOKQMOFM-BPSSIEEOSA-N

Androstenediol 3β-acetate, or 5-androstenediol 3β-acetate, also known as androst-5-ene-3β,17β-diol 3β-acetate, is a synthetic anabolic-androgenic steroid and an androgen ester – specifically, the C3β acetate ester of 5-androstenediol (androst-5-ene-3β,17β-diol) – which was never marketed.

== See also ==
- List of androgen esters
