= Trestolone enanthate =

Chemical compound

Clinical data
- Other names: Trestolone 17β-enanthate; MENT enanthate; 7α-Methyl-19-nortestosterone 17β-enanthate; 7α-Methylestr-4-en-17β-ol-3-one 17β-enanthate
- Drug class: Androgen; Anabolic steroid; Androgen ester

Identifiers
- IUPAC name: (7R,8R,9S,10R,13S,14S,17S)-7,13-Dimethyl-3-oxo-2,3,6,7,8,9,10,11,12,13,14,15,16,17-tetradecahydro-1H-cyclopenta[a]phenanthren-17-yl heptanoate
- CAS Number: 81005-56-3
- UNII: 2UJ2UPS5XU

Chemical and physical data
- Formula: C_{26}H_{40}O_{3}
- Molar mass: 400.603 g·mol^{−1}
- 3D model (JSmol): Interactive image
- SMILES: CCCCCCC(O[C@]1(CC[C@]2([C@@]3([C@@H](CC4=CC(CC[C@@]4([C@]3(CC[C@@]21C)[H])[H])=O)C)[H])[H])[H])=O
- InChI: InChI=1S/C26H40O3/c1-4-5-6-7-8-24(28)29-23-12-11-22-25-17(2)15-18-16-19(27)9-10-20(18)21(25)13-14-26(22,23)3/h16-17,20-23,25H,4-15H2,1-3H3/t17-,20+,21-,22+,23+,25-,26+/m1/s1; Key:YHLLSSBURKVUEG-YFGHHJRWSA-N

Trestolone enanthate, also known as 7α-methyl-19-nortestosterone 17β-enanthate (MENT enanthate), is an androgen and anabolic steroid (AAS) and progestogen which was never marketed. It is an androgen ester; specifically, it is the C17β enanthate (heptanoate) ester of trestolone (7α-methylestr-4-en-17β-ol-3-one). Trestolone enanthate has low affinity for sex hormone-binding globulin (SHBG), similarly to testosterone enanthate.

== See also ==
- List of androgen esters § Esters of other synthetic AAS
