= Androstenediol 17β-acetate =

Chemical compound

Clinical data
- Other names: Androstenediol 17-acetate; 5-Androstenediol 17β-acetate; Androst-5-ene-3β,17β-diol 17β-acetate

Identifiers
- IUPAC name: [(3S,8R,9S,10R,13S,14S,17S)-3-Hydroxy-10,13-dimethyl-2,3,4,7,8,9,11,12,14,15,16,17-dodecahydro-1H-cyclopenta[a]phenanthren-17-yl] acetate
- CAS Number: 5937-72-4
- PubChem CID: 22790941
- ChemSpider: 18504546
- UNII: 7P84NJF610
- CompTox Dashboard (EPA): DTXSID701312069

Chemical and physical data
- Formula: C_{21}H_{32}O_{3}
- Molar mass: 332.484 g·mol^{−1}
- 3D model (JSmol): Interactive image
- SMILES: CC(=O)O[C@H]1CC[C@@H]2[C@@]1(CC[C@H]3[C@H]2CC=C4[C@@]3(CC[C@@H](C4)O)C)C
- InChI: InChI=1S/C21H32O3/c1-13(22)24-19-7-6-17-16-5-4-14-12-15(23)8-10-20(14,2)18(16)9-11-21(17,19)3/h4,15-19,23H,5-12H2,1-3H3/t15-,16-,17-,18-,19-,20-,21-/m0/s1; Key:BMDNPBLUVJZAEA-BPSSIEEOSA-N

Androstenediol 17β-acetate, or 5-androstenediol 17β-acetate, also known as androst-5-ene-3β,17β-diol 17β-acetate, is a synthetic anabolic-androgenic steroid and an androgen ester – specifically, the C17β acetate ester of 5-androstenediol (androst-5-ene-3β,17β-diol) – which was never marketed.

== See also ==
- List of androgen esters
