= Dihydrotestosterone acetate =

Chemical compound

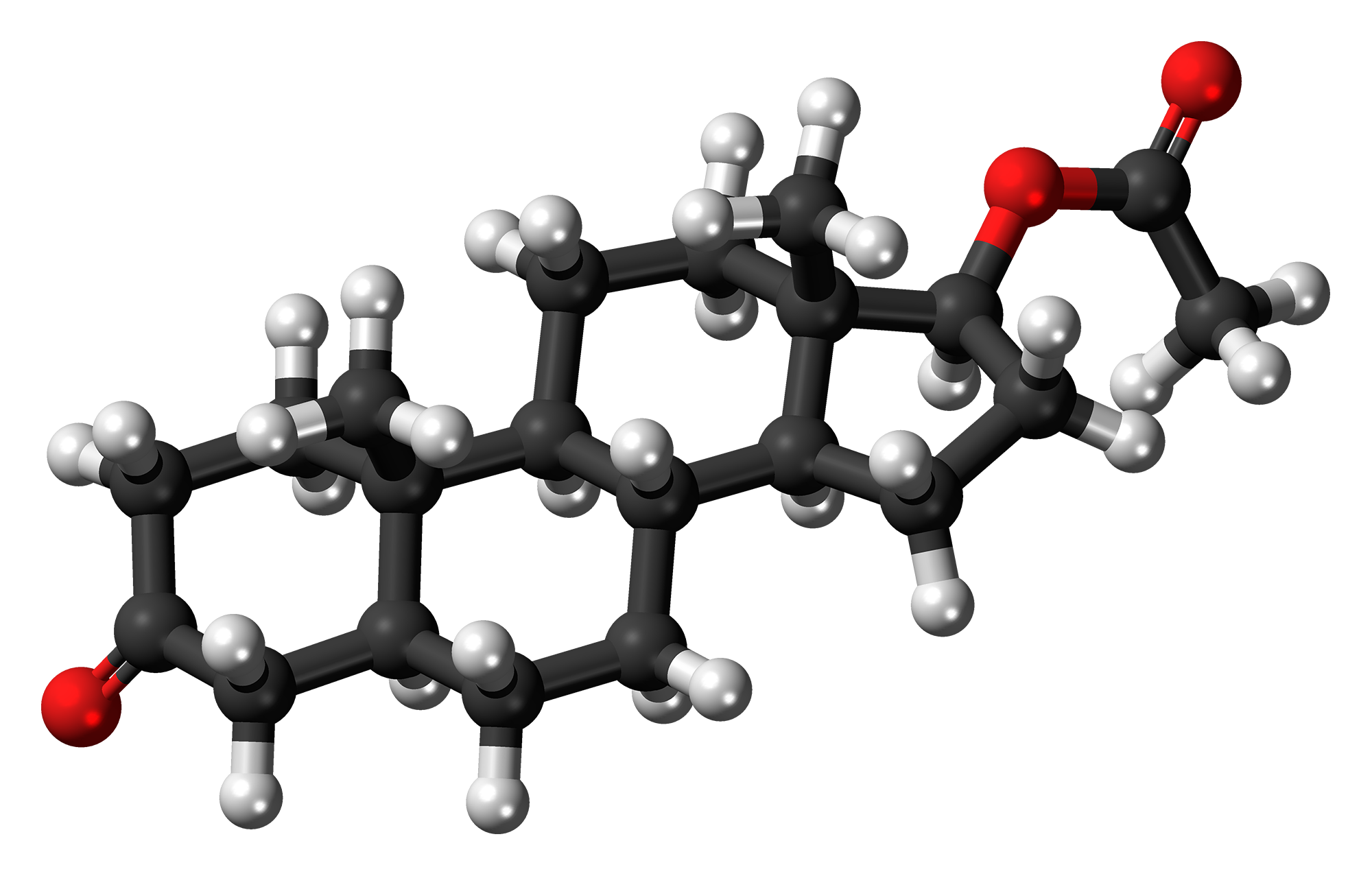

Clinical data
- Other names: androstanolone acetate; Stanolone acetate; 5α-Dihydrotestosterone 17β-acetate; 17β-(Acetyloxy)-5α-androstan-3-one
- Routes of administration: Intramuscular injection

Identifiers
- IUPAC name: [(5S,8R,9S,10S,13S,14S,17S)-10,13-dimethyl-3-oxo-1,2,4,5,6,7,8,9,11,12,14,15,16,17-tetradecahydrocyclopenta[a]phenanthren-17-yl] acetate
- CAS Number: 1164-91-6
- PubChem CID: 11809740
- DrugBank: DB13951
- ChemSpider: 9984405
- UNII: 63Z2Y83W8N
- ChEMBL: ChEMBL3275971
- CompTox Dashboard (EPA): DTXSID90922040

Chemical and physical data
- Formula: C_{21}H_{32}O_{3}
- Molar mass: 332.484 g·mol^{−1}
- 3D model (JSmol): Interactive image
- SMILES: CC(=O)O[C@H]1CC[C@@H]2[C@@]1(CC[C@H]3[C@H]2CC[C@@H]4[C@@]3(CCC(=O)C4)C)C
- InChI: InChI=1S/C21H32O3/c1-13(22)24-19-7-6-17-16-5-4-14-12-15(23)8-10-20(14,2)18(16)9-11-21(17,19)3/h14,16-19H,4-12H2,1-3H3/t14-,16-,17-,18-,19-,20-,21-/m0/s1; Key:ILCTUFVQFCIIDS-NGFSFWIMSA-N

Dihydrotestosterone acetate, also known as androstanolone acetate or stanolone acetate, as well as 5α-dihydrotestosterone 17β-acetate, is a synthetic androgen and anabolic steroid and a dihydrotestosterone ester that was never marketed.

== See also ==
- List of androgen esters § Dihydrotestosterone esters
