= Bolmantalate =

Chemical compound

Clinical data
- Other names: LY-38851; Lilly 38851; Nandrolone adamantoate; Nandrolone adamantane-1-carboxylate; 19-Nortestosterone 17β-adamantoate
- Routes of administration: Intramuscular injection
- Drug class: Androgen; Anabolic steroid; Androgen ester; Progestogen

Identifiers
- IUPAC name: [(8R,9S,10R,13S,14S,17S)-13-methyl-3-oxo-2,6,7,8,9,10,11,12,14,15,16,17-dodecahydro-1H-cyclopenta[a]phenanthren-17-yl] adamantane-1-carboxylate
- CAS Number: 1491-81-2
- PubChem CID: 11954312
- ChemSpider: 10128607
- UNII: 7IKT9C4TYI
- KEGG: D03147
- ChEMBL: ChEMBL2104237
- CompTox Dashboard (EPA): DTXSID60164172

Chemical and physical data
- Formula: C_{29}H_{40}O_{3}
- Molar mass: 436.636 g·mol^{−1}
- 3D model (JSmol): Interactive image
- SMILES: C[C@]12CC[C@H]3[C@H]([C@@H]1CC[C@@H]2OC(=O)C45CC6CC(C4)CC(C6)C5)CCC7=CC(=O)CC[C@H]37
- InChI: InChI=1S/C29H40O3/c1-28-9-8-23-22-5-3-21(30)13-20(22)2-4-24(23)25(28)6-7-26(28)32-27(31)29-14-17-10-18(15-29)12-19(11-17)16-29/h13,17-19,22-26H,2-12,14-16H2,1H3/t17?,18?,19?,22-,23+,24+,25-,26-,28-,29?/m0/s1; Key:NCXAMLZZPQRJGY-PVAKYVEVSA-N

Bolmantalate (developmental code name LY-38851 or Lilly 38851), also known as 19-nortestosterone 17β-adamantoate (or nandrolone adamantoate), is an androgen and anabolic steroid and a nandrolone ester which was synthesized and developed by Eli Lilly in 1965 but was never marketed.

Relative affinities (%) of nandrolone and related steroids
Compound	PR	AR	ER	GR	MR	SHBG	CBG
Nandrolone	20	154–155	<0.1	0.5	1.6	1–16	0.1
Testosterone	1.0–1.2	100	<0.1	0.17	0.9	19–82	3–8
Estradiol	2.6	7.9	100	0.6	0.13	8.7–12	<0.1
Notes: Values are percentages (%). Reference ligands (100%) were progesterone for the PR, testosterone for the AR, estradiol for the ER, dexamethasone for the GR, aldosterone for the MR, dihydrotestosterone for SHBG, and cortisol for CBG. Sources: See template.

== See also ==
- List of androgen esters § Nandrolone esters
