= Androstenediol diacetate =

Chemical compound

Clinical data
- Other names: Androstenediol 3,17-diacetate; 5-Androstenediol 3β,17β-diacetate; Androst-5-ene-3β,17β-diol 3β,17β-diacetate

Identifiers
- IUPAC name: [(3S,8R,9S,10R,13S,14S,17S)-17-Acetyloxy-10,13-dimethyl-2,3,4,7,8,9,11,12,14,15,16,17-dodecahydro-1H-cyclopenta[a]phenanthren-3-yl] acetate
- CAS Number: 2099-26-5
- PubChem CID: 102205
- ChemSpider: 92336
- UNII: 262F47Z2CD
- CompTox Dashboard (EPA): DTXSID10943297
- ECHA InfoCard: 100.016.604

Chemical and physical data
- Formula: C_{23}H_{34}O_{4}
- Molar mass: 374.521 g·mol^{−1}
- 3D model (JSmol): Interactive image
- SMILES: CC(=O)O[C@H]1CC[C@@]2([C@H]3CC[C@]4([C@H]([C@@H]3CC=C2C1)CC[C@@H]4OC(=O)C)C)C
- InChI: InChI=1S/C23H34O4/c1-14(24)26-17-9-11-22(3)16(13-17)5-6-18-19-7-8-21(27-15(2)25)23(19,4)12-10-20(18)22/h5,17-21H,6-13H2,1-4H3/t17-,18-,19-,20-,21-,22-,23-/m0/s1; Key:QXKRUGDXPWHXHL-FQJIPJFPSA-N

Androstenediol diacetate, or 5-androstenediol 3β,17β-diacetate, also known as androst-5-ene-3β,17β-diol 3β,17β-diacetate, is a synthetic anabolic-androgenic steroid and an androgen ester – specifically, the C3β,17β diacetate diester of 5-androstenediol (androst-5-ene-3β,17β-diol) – which was never marketed. The medication has been used with success to treat breast cancer in women.

== See also ==
- List of androgen esters
