= Nandrolone acetate =

Chemical compound

Clinical data
- Other names: 19-Nortestosterone 17β-acetate; 17β-Acetoxy-19-nortestosterone; Estr-4-en-17β-ol-3-one 17β-acetate
- Routes of administration: Intramuscular injection
- Drug class: Androgen; Anabolic steroid; Androgen ester; Progestogen

Identifiers
- IUPAC name: [(8R,9S,10R,13S,14S,17S)-13-Methyl-3-oxo-2,6,7,8,9,10,11,12,14,15,16,17-dodecahydro-1H-cyclopenta[a]phenanthren-17-yl] acetate
- CAS Number: 1425-10-1
- PubChem CID: 102122
- ChemSpider: 92258
- UNII: 8Z4NN9XF7D
- CompTox Dashboard (EPA): DTXSID90931490

Chemical and physical data
- Formula: C_{20}H_{28}O_{3}
- Molar mass: 316.441 g·mol^{−1}
- 3D model (JSmol): Interactive image
- SMILES: CC(=O)O[C@H]1CC[C@@H]2[C@@]1(CC[C@H]3[C@H]2CCC4=CC(=O)CC[C@H]34)C
- InChI: InChI=1S/C20H28O3/c1-12(21)23-19-8-7-18-17-5-3-13-11-14(22)4-6-15(13)16(17)9-10-20(18,19)2/h11,15-19H,3-10H2,1-2H3/t15-,16+,17+,18-,19-,20-/m0/s1; Key:TTWYUPSVWLOIRF-XGXHKTLJSA-N

Nandrolone acetate, also known as 19-nortestosterone 17β-acetate or as estr-4-en-17β-ol-3-one 17β-acetate, is a synthetic, injected anabolic–androgenic steroid (AAS) and a derivative of 19-nortestosterone (nandrolone) that was never marketed. It is an androgen ester – specifically, the C17β acetate ester of nandrolone.

Relative affinities (%) of nandrolone and related steroids
Compound	PR	AR	ER	GR	MR	SHBG	CBG
Nandrolone	20	154–155	<0.1	0.5	1.6	1–16	0.1
Testosterone	1.0–1.2	100	<0.1	0.17	0.9	19–82	3–8
Estradiol	2.6	7.9	100	0.6	0.13	8.7–12	<0.1
Notes: Values are percentages (%). Reference ligands (100%) were progesterone for the PR, testosterone for the AR, estradiol for the ER, dexamethasone for the GR, aldosterone for the MR, dihydrotestosterone for SHBG, and cortisol for CBG. Sources: See template.

== See also ==
- List of androgen esters § Nandrolone esters
