= Nandrolone caproate =

Synthetic androgen and anabolic steroid

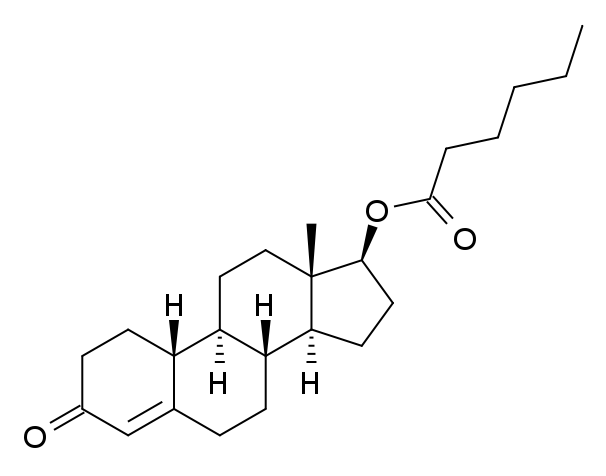

Clinical data
- Trade names: Anabolin Depot
- Other names: Nandrolone hexanoate; 19-Nortestosterone 17β-hexanoate; 17β-((1-Oxohexyl)oxy)estr-4-en-3-one
- Routes of administration: Intramuscular injection
- Drug class: Androgen; Anabolic steroid; Androgen ester; Progestogen

Identifiers
- IUPAC name: [(8R,9S,10R,13S,14S,17S)-13-methyl-3-oxo-2,6,7,8,9,10,11,12,14,15,16,17-dodecahydro-1H-cyclopenta[a]phenanthren-17-yl] hexanoate
- CAS Number: 52230-62-3
- PubChem CID: 104128
- ChemSpider: 94008
- UNII: VLU99Z4GZA
- CompTox Dashboard (EPA): DTXSID70966609

Chemical and physical data
- Formula: C_{24}H_{36}O_{3}
- Molar mass: 372.549 g·mol^{−1}
- 3D model (JSmol): Interactive image
- SMILES: CCCCCC(=O)O[C@H]1CC[C@@H]2[C@@]1(CC[C@H]3[C@H]2CCC4=CC(=O)CC[C@H]34)C
- InChI: InChI=1S/C24H36O3/c1-3-4-5-6-23(26)27-22-12-11-21-20-9-7-16-15-17(25)8-10-18(16)19(20)13-14-24(21,22)2/h15,18-22H,3-14H2,1-2H3/t18-,19+,20+,21-,22-,24-/m0/s1; Key:SBKWVCUBCYGVKF-XFIIBVRQSA-N

Nandrolone caproate (brand name Anabolin Depot), or nandrolone hexanoate, also known as 19-nortestosterone 17β-hexanoate, is a synthetic androgen and anabolic steroid and a nandrolone ester.

Relative affinities (%) of nandrolone and related steroids
| Compound | PR | AR | ER | GR | MR | SHBG | CBG |
|---|---|---|---|---|---|---|---|
| Nandrolone | 20 | 154–155 | <0.1 | 0.5 | 1.6 | 1–16 | 0.1 |
| Testosterone | 1.0–1.2 | 100 | <0.1 | 0.17 | 0.9 | 19–82 | 3–8 |
| Estradiol | 2.6 | 7.9 | 100 | 0.6 | 0.13 | 8.7–12 | <0.1 |
Notes: Values are percentages (%). Reference ligands (100%) were progesterone for the PR, testosterone for the AR, estradiol for the ER, dexamethasone for the GR, aldosterone for the MR, dihydrotestosterone for SHBG, and cortisol for CBG. Sources: See template.

== See also ==
- List of androgen esters § Nandrolone esters
