= Testosterone nicotinate =

Chemical compound

Clinical data
- Trade names: Bolfortan, Linobol
- Other names: WD-53
- Routes of administration: Intramuscular injection

Identifiers
- IUPAC name: (1S,2R,10R,11S,14S,15S)-2,15-dimethyl-5-oxotetracyclo[8.7.0.0^{2,7}.0^{11,15}]heptadec-6-en-14-yl pyridine-3-carboxylate
- CAS Number: 668-56-4
- PubChem CID: 101826
- ChemSpider: 91999
- UNII: 44F122YR9Q
- CompTox Dashboard (EPA): DTXSID60985364
- ECHA InfoCard: 100.010.522

Chemical and physical data
- Formula: C_{25}H_{31}NO_{3}
- Molar mass: 393.527 g·mol^{−1}
- 3D model (JSmol): Interactive image
- SMILES: C[C@]12CC[C@H]3[C@H]([C@@H]1CC[C@@H]2OC(=O)C4=CN=CC=C4)CCC5=CC(=O)CC[C@]35C
- InChI: InChI=1S/C25H31NO3/c1-24-11-9-18(27)14-17(24)5-6-19-20-7-8-22(25(20,2)12-10-21(19)24)29-23(28)16-4-3-13-26-15-16/h3-4,13-15,19-22H,5-12H2,1-2H3/t19-,20-,21-,22-,24-,25-/m0/s1; Key:KHRRLLSDLVLEIT-BKWLFHPQSA-N

Testosterone nicotinate (brand names Bolfortan, Linobol) is an androgen and anabolic steroid medication made by esterifying nicotinic acid and testosterone It was formulated as a 50 mg/mL aqueous suspension provided in ampoules. The medication was manufactured and sold by Lannacher Heilmittel GmbH in Austria. It is no longer marketed.

Testosterone nicotinate had a relatively short duration, somewhere between that of testosterone propionate and testosterone enanthate.

== See also ==
- List of androgen esters § Testosterone esters
