= Testosterone benzoate =

Chemical compound

Clinical data
- Other names: Testosterone 17β-benzoate; Androst-4-en-17β-ol-3-one 17β-benzoate
- Routes of administration: Intramuscular injection

Identifiers
- IUPAC name: [(8R,9S,10R,13S,14S,17S)-10,13-dimethyl-3-oxo-1,2,6,7,8,9,11,12,14,15,16,17-dodecahydrocyclopenta[a]phenanthren-17-yl] benzoate
- CAS Number: 2088-71-3
- PubChem CID: 101474
- ChemSpider: 91692
- UNII: 387187KT3E
- CompTox Dashboard (EPA): DTXSID50943135
- ECHA InfoCard: 100.016.575

Chemical and physical data
- Formula: C_{26}H_{32}O_{3}
- Molar mass: 392.539 g·mol^{−1}
- 3D model (JSmol): Interactive image
- SMILES: C[C@]12CC[C@H]3[C@H]([C@@H]1CC[C@@H]2OC(=O)C4=CC=CC=C4)CCC5=CC(=O)CC[C@]35C
- InChI: InChI=1S/C26H32O3/c1-25-14-12-19(27)16-18(25)8-9-20-21-10-11-23(26(21,2)15-13-22(20)25)29-24(28)17-6-4-3-5-7-17/h3-7,16,20-23H,8-15H2,1-2H3/t20-,21-,22-,23-,25-,26-/m0/s1; Key:RZJSCADWIWNGKI-IXKNJLPQSA-N

Testosterone benzoate, or testosterone 17β-benzoate, also known as androst-4-en-17β-ol-3-one 17β-benzoate, is a synthetic, injected anabolic–androgenic steroid (AAS) and an androgen ester – specifically, the benzoate C17β ester of testosterone – which was never marketed. It is a prodrug of testosterone and, when administered via intramuscular injection, is associated with a long-lasting depot effect and extended duration of action. The drug was first described in 1936 and was the first androgen ester and ester of testosterone to be synthesized.

== See also ==
- List of androgen esters
