= Nandrolone cyclohexanecarboxylate =

Synthetic androgen and anabolic steroid

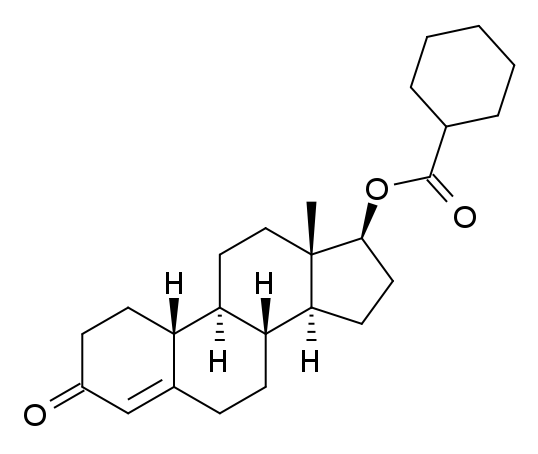

Clinical data
- Trade names: Nor-Durandron, Norlongandron
- Other names: NSC-3351; Nandrolone hexahydrobenzoate; 19-Nortestosterone 17β-cyclohexanecarboxylate
- Routes of administration: Intramuscular injection
- Drug class: Androgen; Anabolic steroid; Androgen ester; Progestogen

Identifiers
- IUPAC name: [(8R,9S,10R,13S,14S,17S)-13-methyl-3-oxo-2,6,7,8,9,10,11,12,14,15,16,17-dodecahydro-1H-cyclopenta[a]phenanthren-17-yl] cyclohexanecarboxylate
- CAS Number: 18470-94-5
- PubChem CID: 9929986
- ChemSpider: 8105617
- UNII: 45FAH33FMM

Chemical and physical data
- Formula: C_{25}H_{36}O_{3}
- Molar mass: 384.560 g·mol^{−1}
- 3D model (JSmol): Interactive image
- SMILES: C[C@]12CC[C@H]3[C@H]([C@@H]1CC[C@@H]2OC(=O)C4CCCCC4)CCC5=CC(=O)CC[C@H]35
- InChI: InChI=1S/C25H36O3/c1-25-14-13-20-19-10-8-18(26)15-17(19)7-9-21(20)22(25)11-12-23(25)28-24(27)16-5-3-2-4-6-16/h15-16,19-23H,2-14H2,1H3/t19-,20+,21+,22-,23-,25-/m0/s1; Key:AQMOXBCKEKPDRF-YNFNDHOQSA-N

Nandrolone cyclohexanecarboxylate (brand names Nor-Durandron, Norlongandron; former developmental code name NSC-3351), or nandrolone hexahydrobenzoate, also known as 19-nortestosterone 17β-cyclohexanecarboxylate, is a synthetic androgen and anabolic steroid and a nandrolone ester that has been marketed by Ferring Pharmaceuticals since at least 1961.

Relative affinities (%) of nandrolone and related steroids
Compound	PR	AR	ER	GR	MR	SHBG	CBG
Nandrolone	20	154–155	<0.1	0.5	1.6	1–16	0.1
Testosterone	1.0–1.2	100	<0.1	0.17	0.9	19–82	3–8
Estradiol	2.6	7.9	100	0.6	0.13	8.7–12	<0.1
Notes: Values are percentages (%). Reference ligands (100%) were progesterone for the PR, testosterone for the AR, estradiol for the ER, dexamethasone for the GR, aldosterone for the MR, dihydrotestosterone for SHBG, and cortisol for CBG. Sources: See template.

== See also ==
- List of androgen esters § Nandrolone esters
