= Nandrolone hydrogen succinate =

Chemical compound

Clinical data
- Trade names: Anabolico, Menidrabol
- Other names: Nandrolone hemisuccinate; 19-Nortestosterone 17β-(3-carboxy)propionate
- Routes of administration: Intramuscular injection
- Drug class: Androgen; Anabolic steroid; Androgen ester; Progestogen

Identifiers
- IUPAC name: 4-[[(8R,9S,10R,13S,14S,17S)-13-methyl-3-oxo-2,6,7,8,9,10,11,12,14,15,16,17-dodecahydro-1H-cyclopenta[a]phenanthren-17-yl]oxy]-4-oxobutanoic acid
- CAS Number: 6785-62-2
- PubChem CID: 94333
- ChemSpider: 85135
- UNII: 7IKF7WW60T
- CompTox Dashboard (EPA): DTXSID70987197
- ECHA InfoCard: 100.027.136

Chemical and physical data
- Formula: C_{22}H_{30}O_{5}
- Molar mass: 374.477 g·mol^{−1}
- 3D model (JSmol): Interactive image
- SMILES: [H][C@@]12CC[C@H](OC(=O)CCC(O)=O)[C@@]1(C)CC[C@]1([H])[C@@]3([H])CCC(=O)C=C3CC[C@@]21[H]
- InChI: InChI=1S/C22H30O5/c1-22-11-10-16-15-5-3-14(23)12-13(15)2-4-17(16)18(22)6-7-19(22)27-21(26)9-8-20(24)25/h12,15-19H,2-11H2,1H3,(H,24,25)/t15-,16+,17+,18-,19-,22-/m0/s1; Key:IRQUJNVGEAJGSD-WUOGMODZSA-N

Nandrolone hydrogen succinate (brand name Anabolico, Menidrabol), or nandrolone hemisuccinate, also known as 19-nortestosterone 17β-(3-carboxy)propionate, is a synthetic androgen and anabolic steroid and a nandrolone ester that is or has been marketed in Italy.

Relative affinities (%) of nandrolone and related steroids
Compound	PR	AR	ER	GR	MR	SHBG	CBG
Nandrolone	20	154–155	<0.1	0.5	1.6	1–16	0.1
Testosterone	1.0–1.2	100	<0.1	0.17	0.9	19–82	3–8
Estradiol	2.6	7.9	100	0.6	0.13	8.7–12	<0.1
Notes: Values are percentages (%). Reference ligands (100%) were progesterone for the PR, testosterone for the AR, estradiol for the ER, dexamethasone for the GR, aldosterone for the MR, dihydrotestosterone for SHBG, and cortisol for CBG. Sources: See template.

== See also ==
- List of androgen esters § Nandrolone esters
