= Testosterone hexahydrobenzylcarbonate =

Chemical compound

Clinical data
- Routes of administration: Intramuscular injection

Identifiers
- IUPAC name: Cyclohexylmethyl (1S,2R,10R,11S,14S,15S)-2,15-dimethyl-5-oxotetracyclo[8.7.0.0^{2,7}.0^{11,15}]heptadec-6-en-14-yl carbonate
- CAS Number: 2697-92-9
- PubChem CID: 102314
- ChemSpider: 92426
- CompTox Dashboard (EPA): DTXSID20949745

Chemical and physical data
- Formula: C_{27}H_{40}O_{4}
- Molar mass: 428.613 g·mol^{−1}
- 3D model (JSmol): Interactive image
- SMILES: C[C@]12CC[C@H]3[C@H]([C@@H]1CC[C@@H]2OC(=O)OCC4CCCCC4)CCC5=CC(=O)CC[C@]35C
- InChI: InChI=1S/C27H40O4/c1-26-14-12-20(28)16-19(26)8-9-21-22-10-11-24(27(22,2)15-13-23(21)26)31-25(29)30-17-18-6-4-3-5-7-18/h16,18,21-24H,3-15,17H2,1-2H3/t21-,22-,23-,24-,26-,27-/m0/s1; Key:INQMBXZKQQQESC-ZLQWOROUSA-N

Testosterone hexahydrobenzylcarbonate (brand name Lontanyl), or testosterone cyclohexylmethylcarbonate, is an androgen and anabolic steroid and a testosterone ester.
