= Testosterone furoate =

Androgen and anabolic steroid

Clinical data
- Trade names: Furotest
- Other names: Testosterone 17β-(2-furoate); Testosterone 17β-(2-furoic acid); Testosterone furanate; 3-Oxoandrost-4-en-17β-yl 2-furoate
- Routes of administration: Intramuscular injection

Identifiers
- IUPAC name: (1S,2R,10R,11S,14S,15S)-2,15-dimethyl-5-oxotetracyclo[8.7.0.0^{2,7}.0^{11,15}]heptadec-6-en-14-yl furan-2-carboxylate
- CAS Number: 60895-85-4
- ChemSpider: 58539761
- UNII: 2ZF5A2M4J6
- CompTox Dashboard (EPA): DTXSID001336024

Chemical and physical data
- Formula: C_{24}H_{30}O_{4}
- Molar mass: 382.500 g·mol^{−1}
- 3D model (JSmol): Interactive image
- SMILES: C[C@]12CC[C@H]3[C@@H](CCC4=CC(=O)CC[C@]34C)[C@@H]1CC[C@@H]2OC(=O)c5occc5
- InChI: InChI=1S/C24H30O4/c1-23-11-9-16(25)14-15(23)5-6-17-18-7-8-21(24(18,2)12-10-19(17)23)28-22(26)20-4-3-13-27-20/h3-4,13-14,17-19,21H,5-12H2,1-2H3/t17-,18-,19-,21-,23-,24-/m0/s1; Key:GGOXAZFFJDKPQA-QRPBXLKNSA-N

Testosterone furoate (brand name Furotest), also referred to as testosterone furanate in some publications, is an androgen and anabolic steroid and a testosterone ester which is no longer marketed.

== See also ==
- List of androgen esters § Testosterone esters
