= Testosterone hexyloxyphenylpropionate =

Androgenic steroid

Clinical data
- Routes of administration: Intramuscular injection

Identifiers
- IUPAC name: (1S,2R,10R,11S,14S,15S)-2,15-dimethyl-5-oxotetracyclo[8.7.0.0^{2,7}.0^{11,15}]heptadec-6-en-14-yl 3-[4-(hexyloxy)phenyl]propanoate
- CAS Number: 4838-37-3
- PubChem CID: 92135917
- ChemSpider: 52083414
- UNII: 18BZ96H4K3

Chemical and physical data
- Formula: C_{34}H_{48}O_{4}
- Molar mass: 520.754 g·mol^{−1}
- 3D model (JSmol): Interactive image
- SMILES: CCCCCCOC1=CC=C(C=C1)CCC(=O)O[C@H]2CC[C@@H]3[C@@]2(CC[C@H]4[C@H]3CCC5=CC(=O)CC[C@]45C)C
- InChI: InChI=1S/C34H48O4/c1-4-5-6-7-22-37-27-12-8-24(9-13-27)10-17-32(36)38-31-16-15-29-28-14-11-25-23-26(35)18-20-33(25,2)30(28)19-21-34(29,31)3/h8-9,12-13,23,28-31H,4-7,10-11,14-22H2,1-3H3/t28-,29-,30-,31-,33-,34-/m0/s1; Key:GEZMYESNOKRHQS-BSIQDFODSA-N

Testosterone hexyloxyphenylpropionate (brand name Andradurin) is an androgen and anabolic steroid and a testosterone ester.
