= Nandrolone furylpropionate =

Chemical compound

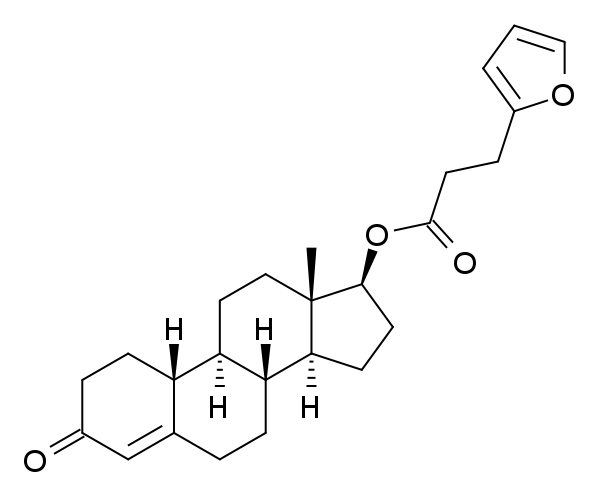

Clinical data
- Trade names: Demelon
- Other names: NFP; Nandrolone 17β-furylpropionate; 19-Nortestosterone 17β-(2-furanyl)propanoate
- Routes of administration: Intramuscular injection
- Drug class: Androgen; Anabolic steroid; Androgen ester; Progestogen

Identifiers
- IUPAC name: [(8R,9S,10R,13S,14S,17S)-13-methyl-3-oxo-2,6,7,8,9,10,11,12,14,15,16,17-dodecahydro-1H-cyclopenta[a]phenanthren-17-yl] 3-(furan-2-yl)propanoate
- CAS Number: 7642-64-0
- PubChem CID: 111318
- ChemSpider: 99880
- UNII: W1309SNY8U
- CompTox Dashboard (EPA): DTXSID6057823
- ECHA InfoCard: 100.028.709

Chemical and physical data
- Formula: C_{25}H_{32}O_{4}
- Molar mass: 396.527 g·mol^{−1}
- 3D model (JSmol): Interactive image
- SMILES: C[C@]12CC[C@H]3[C@H]([C@@H]1CC[C@@H]2OC(=O)CCC4=CC=CO4)CCC5=CC(=O)CC[C@H]35
- InChI: InChI=1S/C25H32O4/c1-25-13-12-20-19-8-5-17(26)15-16(19)4-7-21(20)22(25)9-10-23(25)29-24(27)11-6-18-3-2-14-28-18/h2-3,14-15,19-23H,4-13H2,1H3/t19-,20+,21+,22-,23-,25-/m0/s1; Key:ICNIVTHKZKRHPD-YNFNDHOQSA-N

Nandrolone furylpropionate (NFP) (JAN) (brand name Demelon), also known as 19-nortestosterone 17β-(2-furanyl)propanoate, is a synthetic androgen and anabolic steroid and a nandrolone ester. It was developed and marketed by Mochida Pharmaceutical in Japan in the 1960s.

Relative affinities (%) of nandrolone and related steroids
Compound	PR	AR	ER	GR	MR	SHBG	CBG
Nandrolone	20	154–155	<0.1	0.5	1.6	1–16	0.1
Testosterone	1.0–1.2	100	<0.1	0.17	0.9	19–82	3–8
Estradiol	2.6	7.9	100	0.6	0.13	8.7–12	<0.1
Notes: Values are percentages (%). Reference ligands (100%) were progesterone for the PR, testosterone for the AR, estradiol for the ER, dexamethasone for the GR, aldosterone for the MR, dihydrotestosterone for SHBG, and cortisol for CBG. Sources: See template.

== See also ==
- List of androgen esters § Nandrolone esters
