= Testosterone buciclate =

Chemical compound

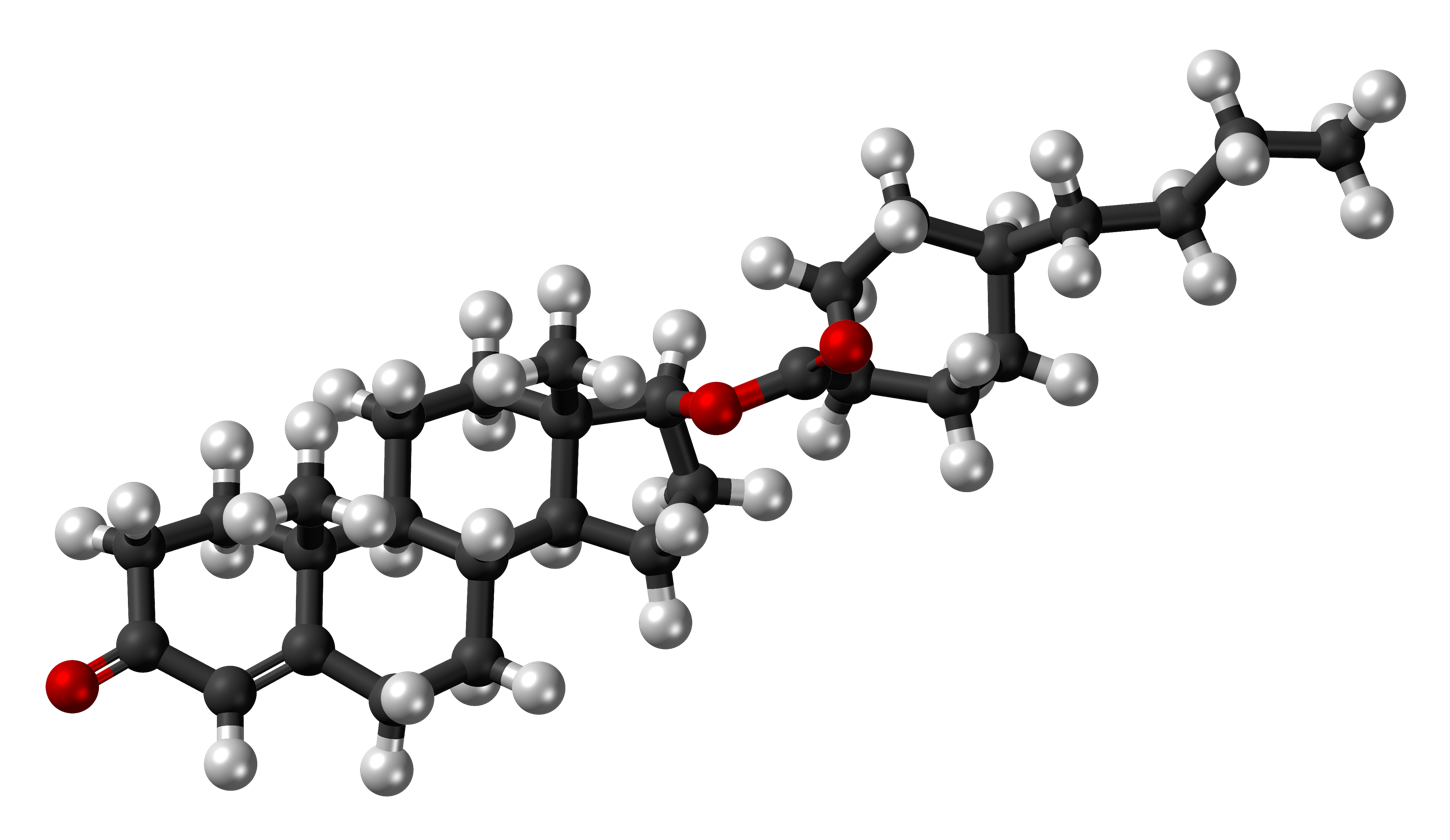

Clinical data
- Other names: Testosterone bucyclate; Testosterone 17β-buciclate; 20 Aet-1; CDB-1781; Testosterone 17β-(trans-4-butylcyclohexyl)carboxylate
- Routes of administration: Intramuscular injection
- Drug class: Androgen; Anabolic steroid; Androgen ester

Pharmacokinetic data
- Bioavailability: Oral: very low Intramuscular: very high
- Metabolism: Liver
- Elimination half-life: Tea seed oil: 20.9 days (i.m.); Castor oil: 33.9 days (i.m.)
- Excretion: Urine

Identifiers
- IUPAC name: [(8R,9S,10R,13S,14S,17S)-10,13-dimethyl-3-oxo-1,2,6,7,8,9,11,12,14,15,16,17-dodecahydrocyclopenta[a]phenanthren-17-yl] 4-butylcyclohexane-1-carboxylate
- CAS Number: 105165–22–8
- PubChem CID: 114819
- ChemSpider: 19978531
- UNII: 39BV4XZ2CW
- CompTox Dashboard (EPA): DTXSID90909371

Chemical and physical data
- Formula: C_{30}H_{46}O_{3}
- Molar mass: 454.695 g·mol^{−1}
- 3D model (JSmol): Interactive image
- SMILES: CCCCC1CCC(CC1)C(=O)O[C@H]2CC[C@@H]3[C@@]2(CC[C@H]4[C@H]3CCC5=CC(=O)CC[C@]45C)C
- InChI: InChI=1S/C30H46O3/c1-4-5-6-20-7-9-21(10–8–20)28(32)33-27-14-13-25-24-12-11-22-19-23(31)15-17-29(22,2)26(24)16-18-30(25,27)3/h19-21,24-27H,4-18H2,1-3H3/t20?,21?,24-,25-,26-,27-,29-,30-/m0/s1; Key:ODZDZTOROXGJAV-IRWJKHRASA-N

Testosterone buciclate (developmental code names 20 Aet-1, CDB-1781) is a synthetic, injected anabolic–androgenic steroid (AAS) which was never marketed. It was developed in collaboration by the Contraceptive Development Branch (CDB) of the National Institute of Child Health and Human Development (NICHD) and the World Health Organization (WHO) in the 1970s and early 1980s for use in androgen replacement therapy for male hypogonadism and as a potential male contraceptive. It was first described in 1986. The medication is an androgen ester – specifically, the C17β buciclate (4-butylcyclohexane-1-carboxylate) ester of testosterone – and is a prodrug of testosterone with a very long duration of action when used as a depot via intramuscular injection. Testosterone buciclate is formulated as a microcrystalline aqueous suspension with a defined particle size of at least 75% in the range of 10 to 50 μm.

A single intramuscular injection of testosterone buciclate has been found to produce physiological levels of testosterone within the normal range in hypogonadal men for 3 to 4 months. The elimination half-life and mean residence time (average amount of time a single molecule of drug stays in the body) of testosterone buciclate were found to be 29.5 days and 60.0 days, respectively, whereas those of testosterone enanthate in castor oil were only 4.5 days and 8.5 days. Testosterone buciclate also lasts longer than testosterone undecanoate, which has elimination half-lives and mean residence times of 20.9 days and 34.9 days in tea seed oil and 33.9 days and 36.0 days in castor oil, respectively. In addition, there is a spike in testosterone levels with testosterone enanthate and testosterone undecanoate that is not seen with testosterone buciclate, with which levels stay highly uniform and decrease very gradually and progressively. Testosterone buciclate can maintain testosterone levels in the normal male range for up to 20 weeks with a single intramuscular injection.

Testosterone buciclate is able to reversibly and completely suppress spermatogenesis in men when used at sufficiently high dosages. As such, the results of clinical studies for use of testosterone buciclate as a male contraceptive were promising, and trials continued as late as 1995, but progress ultimately came to a standstill because the WHO was unable to find an industry partner willing to continue the development of the drug. Because of this, the WHO backed away from testosterone buciclate and focused its research instead on testosterone undecanoate, which is also very long-lasting and has the advantage of having already been marketed and approved for medical use.

Androgen replacement therapy formulations and dosages used in men
Route	Medication	Major brand names	Form	Dosage
Oral	Testosterone^{a}	–	Tablet	400–800 mg/day (in divided doses)
Oral	Testosterone undecanoate	Andriol, Jatenzo, Kyzatrex	Capsule	40–80 mg/2–4× day (with meals)
Oral	Methyltestosterone^{b}	Android, Metandren, Testred	Tablet	10–50 mg/day
Oral	Fluoxymesterone^{b}	Halotestin, Ora-Testryl, Ultandren	Tablet	5–20 mg/day
Oral	Metandienone^{b}	Dianabol	Tablet	5–15 mg/day
Oral	Mesterolone^{b}	Proviron	Tablet	25–150 mg/day
Sublingual	Testosterone^{b}	Testoral	Tablet	5–10 mg 1–4×/day
Sublingual	Methyltestosterone^{b}	Metandren, Oreton Methyl	Tablet	10–30 mg/day
Buccal	Testosterone	Striant	Tablet	30 mg 2×/day
Buccal	Methyltestosterone^{b}	Metandren, Oreton Methyl	Tablet	5–25 mg/day
Transdermal	Testosterone	AndroGel, Testim, TestoGel	Gel	25–125 mg/day
Transdermal	Testosterone	Androderm, AndroPatch, TestoPatch	Non-scrotal patch	2.5–15 mg/day
Transdermal	Testosterone	Testoderm	Scrotal patch	4–6 mg/day
Transdermal	Testosterone	Axiron	Axillary solution	30–120 mg/day
Transdermal	Androstanolone (DHT)	Andractim	Gel	100–250 mg/day
Rectal	Testosterone	Rektandron, Testosteron^{b}	Suppository	40 mg 2–3×/day
Injection (IM or SC)	Testosterone	Andronaq, Sterotate, Virosterone	Aqueous suspension	10–50 mg 2–3×/week
Injection (IM or SC)	Testosterone propionate^{b}	Testoviron	Oil solution	10–50 mg 2–3×/week
Injection (IM or SC)	Testosterone enanthate	Delatestryl	Oil solution	50–250 mg 1x/1–4 weeks
Injection (IM or SC)	Testosterone enanthate	Xyosted	Auto-injector	50–100 mg 1×/week
Injection (IM or SC)	Testosterone cypionate	Depo-Testosterone	Oil solution	50–250 mg 1x/1–4 weeks
Injection (IM or SC)	Testosterone isobutyrate	Agovirin Depot	Aqueous suspension	50–100 mg 1x/1–2 weeks
Injection (IM or SC)	Testosterone phenylacetate^{b}	Perandren, Androject	Oil solution	50–200 mg 1×/3–5 weeks
Injection (IM or SC)	Mixed testosterone esters	Sustanon 100, Sustanon 250	Oil solution	50–250 mg 1×/2–4 weeks
Injection (IM or SC)	Testosterone undecanoate	Aveed, Nebido	Oil solution	750–1,000 mg 1×/10–14 weeks
Injection (IM or SC)	Testosterone buciclate^{a}	–	Aqueous suspension	600–1,000 mg 1×/12–20 weeks
Implant	Testosterone	Testopel	Pellet	150–1,200 mg/3–6 months
Notes: Men produce about 3 to 11 mg of testosterone per day (mean 7 mg/day in young men). Footnotes: ^{a} = Never marketed. ^{b} = No longer used and/or no longer marketed. Sources: See template.

Pharmacokinetics of testosterone esters
Testosterone ester	Form	Route	T_{max}	t_{1/2}	MRT
Testosterone undecanoate	Oil-filled capsules	Oral	?	1.6 hours	3.7 hours
Testosterone propionate	Oil solution	Intramuscular injection	?	0.8 days	1.5 days
Testosterone enanthate	Castor oil solution	Intramuscular injection	10 days	4.5 days	8.5 days
Testosterone undecanoate	Tea seed oil solution	Intramuscular injection	13.0 days	20.9 days	34.9 days
Testosterone undecanoate	Castor oil solution	Intramuscular injection	11.4 days	33.9 days	36.0 days
Testosterone buciclate^{a}	Aqueous suspension	Intramuscular injection	25.8 days	29.5 days	60.0 days
Notes: Testosterone cypionate has similar pharmacokinetics to Testosterone enanthate. Footnotes: ^{a} = Never marketed. Sources: See template.

Parenteral durations of androgens/anabolic steroids
Medication	Form	Major brand names	Duration
Testosterone	Aqueous suspension	Andronaq, Sterotate, Virosterone	2–3 days
Testosterone propionate	Oil solution	Androteston, Perandren, Testoviron	3–4 days
Testosterone phenylpropionate	Oil solution	Testolent	8 days
Testosterone isobutyrate	Aqueous suspension	Agovirin Depot, Perandren M	14 days
Mixed testosterone esters^{a}	Oil solution	Triolandren	10–20 days
Mixed testosterone esters^{b}	Oil solution	Testosid Depot	14–20 days
Testosterone enanthate	Oil solution	Delatestryl	14–28 days
Testosterone cypionate	Oil solution	Depovirin	14–28 days
Mixed testosterone esters^{c}	Oil solution	Sustanon 250	28 days
Testosterone undecanoate	Oil solution	Aveed, Nebido	100 days
Testosterone buciclate^{d}	Aqueous suspension	20 Aet-1, CDB-1781^{e}	90–120 days
Nandrolone phenylpropionate	Oil solution	Durabolin	10 days
Nandrolone decanoate	Oil solution	Deca Durabolin	21–28 days
Methandriol	Aqueous suspension	Notandron, Protandren	8 days
Methandriol bisenanthoyl acetate	Oil solution	Notandron Depot	16 days
Metenolone acetate	Oil solution	Primobolan	3 days
Metenolone enanthate	Oil solution	Primobolan Depot	14 days
Note: All are via i.m. injection. Footnotes: ^{a} = TP, TV, and TUe. ^{b} = TP and TKL. ^{c} = TP, TPP, TiCa, and TD. ^{d} = Studied but never marketed. ^{e} = Developmental code names. Sources: See template.

Structural properties of major testosterone esters
Androgen	Structure	Ester				Relative mol. weight	Relative T content^{b}	logP^{c}
Androgen	Structure	Position(s)	Moiet(ies)	Type	Length^{a}	Relative mol. weight	Relative T content^{b}	logP^{c}
Testosterone		–	–	–	–	1.00	1.00	3.0–3.4
Testosterone propionate		C17β	Propanoic acid	Straight-chain fatty acid	3	1.19	0.84	3.7–4.9
Testosterone isobutyrate		C17β	Isobutyric acid	Branched-chain fatty acid	– (~3)	1.24	0.80	4.9–5.3
Testosterone isocaproate		C17β	Isohexanoic acid	Branched-chain fatty acid	– (~5)	1.34	0.75	4.4–6.3
Testosterone caproate		C17β	Hexanoic acid	Straight-chain fatty acid	6	1.35	0.75	5.8–6.5
Testosterone phenylpropionate		C17β	Phenylpropanoic acid	Aromatic fatty acid	– (~6)	1.46	0.69	5.8–6.5
Testosterone cypionate		C17β	Cyclopentylpropanoic acid	Cyclic carboxylic acid	– (~6)	1.43	0.70	5.1–7.0
Testosterone enanthate		C17β	Heptanoic acid	Straight-chain fatty acid	7	1.39	0.72	3.6–7.0
Testosterone decanoate		C17β	Decanoic acid	Straight-chain fatty acid	10	1.53	0.65	6.3–8.6
Testosterone undecanoate		C17β	Undecanoic acid	Straight-chain fatty acid	11	1.58	0.63	6.7–9.2
Testosterone buciclate^{d}		C17β	Bucyclic acid^{e}	Cyclic carboxylic acid	– (~9)	1.58	0.63	7.9–8.5
Footnotes: ^{a} = Length of ester in carbon atoms for straight-chain fatty acids or approximate length of ester in carbon atoms for aromatic or cyclic fatty acids. ^{b} = Relative testosterone content by weight (i.e., relative androgenic/anabolic potency). ^{c} = Experimental or predicted octanol/water partition coefficient (i.e., lipophilicity/hydrophobicity). Retrieved from PubChem, ChemSpider, and DrugBank. ^{d} = Never marketed. ^{e} = Bucyclic acid = trans-4-Butylcyclohexane-1-carboxylic acid. Sources: See individual articles.

== See also ==
- List of androgen esters § Testosterone esters
- Polytestosterone phloretin phosphate
