= Testosterone isocaproate =

Chemical compound

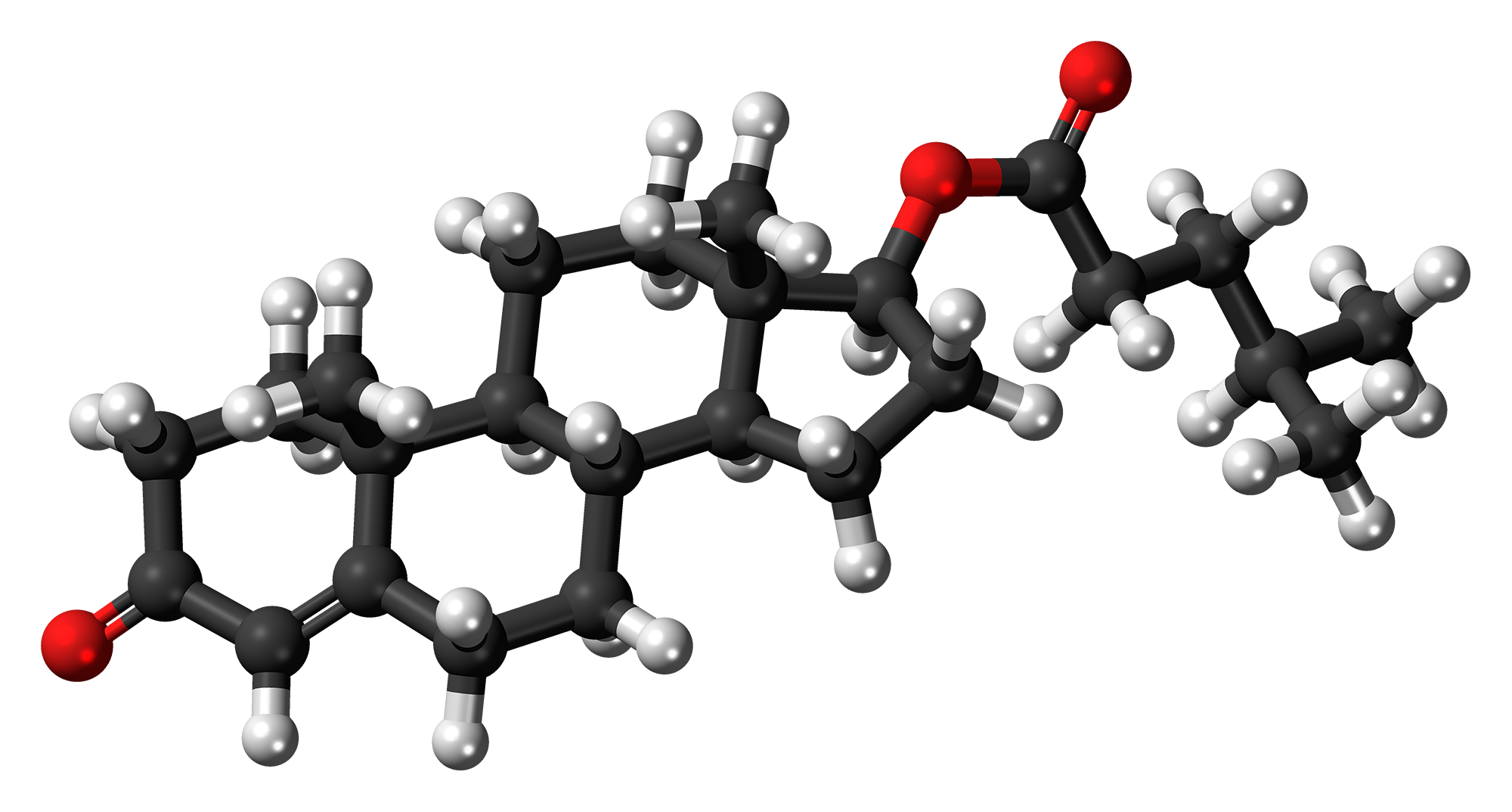

Clinical data
- Trade names: Sustanon 100, Sustanon 250, Omnadren 250
- Other names: TiCa; Testosterone 4-methylvalerate
- Routes of administration: Intramuscular injection

Identifiers
- IUPAC name: [(8R,9S,10R,13S,14S,17S)-10,13-dimethyl-3-oxo-1,2,6,7,8,9,11,12,14,15,16,17-dodecahydrocyclopenta[a]phenanthren-17-yl] 4-methylpentanoate
- CAS Number: 15262-86-9
- PubChem CID: 231084
- DrugBank: DB16002
- ChemSpider: 201317
- UNII: X8ST05GYDM
- CompTox Dashboard (EPA): DTXSID0046806
- ECHA InfoCard: 100.035.718

Chemical and physical data
- Formula: C_{25}H_{38}O_{3}
- Molar mass: 386.576 g·mol^{−1}
- 3D model (JSmol): Interactive image
- SMILES: CC(C)CCC(=O)OC1CCC2C1(CCC3C2CCC4=CC(=O)CCC34C)C
- InChI: InChI=1S/C25H38O3/c1-16(2)5-10-23(27)28-22-9-8-20-19-7-6-17-15-18(26)11-13-24(17,3)21(19)12-14-25(20,22)4/h15-16,19-22H,5-14H2,1-4H3/t19-,20-,21-,22-,24-,25-/m0/s1; Key:PPYHLSBUTAPNGT-BKWLFHPQSA-N

Testosterone isocaproate (BAN; TiCa), sold under the brand names Sustanon 100, Sustanon 250, and Omnadren 250, is an androgen and anabolic steroid medication and a testosterone ester which has been used as a component of mixed testosterone ester preparations.

Beware of allergic reactions as ester's are suspended in arachis oil (refined peanut oil) can in some cases cause allergic reactions.

Parenteral durations of androgens/anabolic steroids
| Medication | Form | Major brand names | Duration |
|---|---|---|---|
| Testosterone | Aqueous suspension | Andronaq, Sterotate, Virosterone | 2–3 days |
| Testosterone propionate | Oil solution | Androteston, Perandren, Testoviron | 3–4 days |
| Testosterone phenylpropionate | Oil solution | Testolent | 8 days |
| Testosterone isobutyrate | Aqueous suspension | Agovirin Depot, Perandren M | 14 days |
| Mixed testosterone esters^{a} | Oil solution | Triolandren | 10–20 days |
| Mixed testosterone esters^{b} | Oil solution | Testosid Depot | 14–20 days |
| Testosterone enanthate | Oil solution | Delatestryl | 14–28 days |
| Testosterone cypionate | Oil solution | Depovirin | 14–28 days |
| Mixed testosterone esters^{c} | Oil solution | Sustanon 250 | 28 days |
| Testosterone undecanoate | Oil solution | Aveed, Nebido | 100 days |
| Testosterone buciclate^{d} | Aqueous suspension | 20 Aet-1, CDB-1781^{e} | 90–120 days |
| Nandrolone phenylpropionate | Oil solution | Durabolin | 10 days |
| Nandrolone decanoate | Oil solution | Deca Durabolin | 21–28 days |
| Methandriol | Aqueous suspension | Notandron, Protandren | 8 days |
| Methandriol bisenanthoyl acetate | Oil solution | Notandron Depot | 16 days |
| Metenolone acetate | Oil solution | Primobolan | 3 days |
| Metenolone enanthate | Oil solution | Primobolan Depot | 14 days |
Note: All are via i.m. injection. Footnotes: ^{a} = TP, TV, and TUe. ^{b} = TP and TKL. ^{c} = TP, TPP, TiCa, and TD. ^{d} = Studied but never marketed. ^{e} = Developmental code names. Sources: See template.

== See also ==
- List of androgen esters § Testosterone esters
