= Metenolone enanthate =

Chemical compound

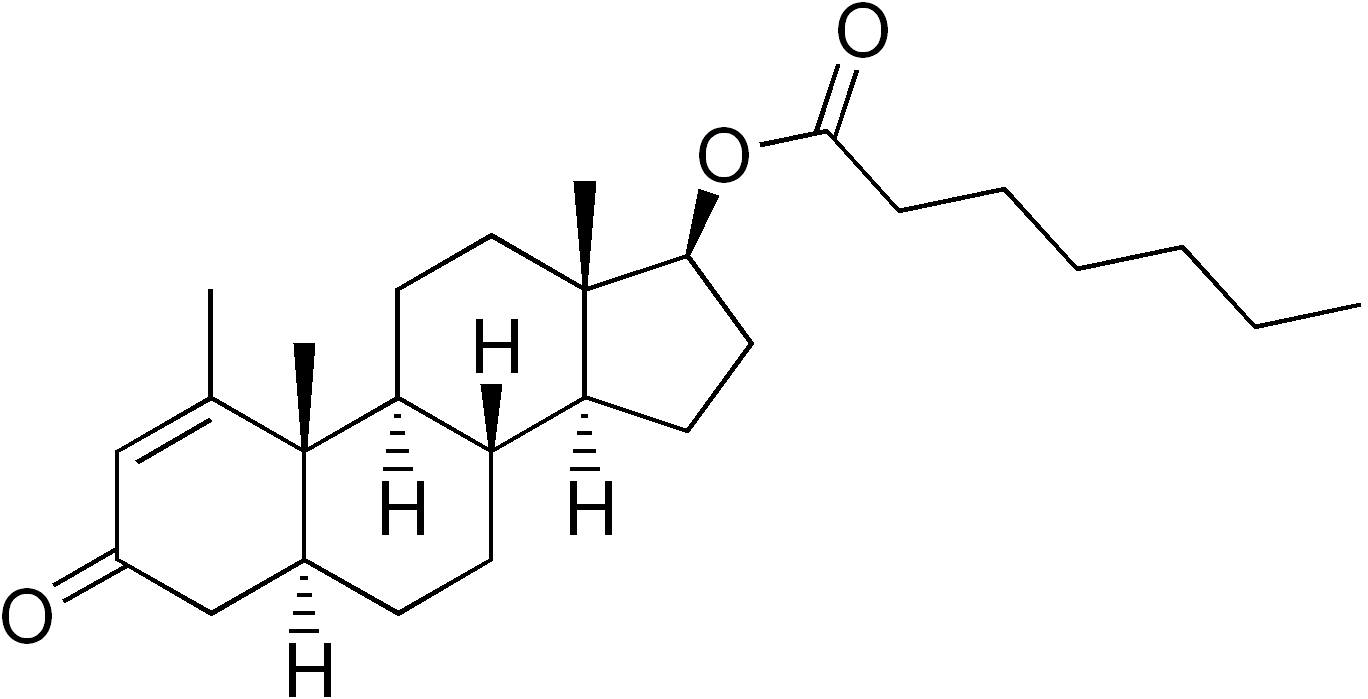

Clinical data
- Trade names: Nibal Injection, Primobolan Depot
- Other names: Methenolone enanthate; Metenolone heptanoate; Metenolone 17β-enanthate; NSC-64967; SH-601; SQ-16374; 1-Methyl-4,5α-dihydrotestosterone 17β-heptanoate; 1-Methyl-DHT heptanoate; 1-Methyl-5α-androst-1-en-17β-ol-3-one 17β-heptanoate
- Routes of administration: Intramuscular injection
- Drug class: Androgen; Anabolic steroid; Androgen ester

Legal status
- Legal status: US: Schedule III

Pharmacokinetic data
- Elimination half-life: IM: 10.5 days

Identifiers
- IUPAC name: [(5S,8R,9S,10S,13S,14S,17S)-1,10,13-trimethyl-3-oxo-4,5,6,7,8,9,11,12,14,15,16,17-dodecahydrocyclopenta[a]phenanthren-17-yl] heptanoate
- CAS Number: 303-42-4
- PubChem CID: 248271
- ChemSpider: 217360
- UNII: 0SPD480WFH
- CompTox Dashboard (EPA): DTXSID7046754
- ECHA InfoCard: 100.005.584

Chemical and physical data
- Formula: C_{27}H_{42}O_{3}
- Molar mass: 414.630 g·mol^{−1}
- 3D model (JSmol): Interactive image
- SMILES: O=C2\C=C(\C)[C@@]3([C@H]1CC[C@@]4([C@@H](OC(=O)CCCCCC)CC[C@H]4[C@@H]1CC[C@H]3C2)C)C
- InChI: InChI=1S/C27H42O3/c1-5-6-7-8-9-25(29)30-24-13-12-22-21-11-10-19-17-20(28)16-18(2)27(19,4)23(21)14-15-26(22,24)3/h16,19,21-24H,5-15,17H2,1-4H3/t19-,21-,22-,23-,24-,26-,27-/m0/s1; Key:TXUICONDJPYNPY-FRXWOFFRSA-N

Metenolone enanthate, or methenolone enanthate, sold under the brand names Primobolan Depot and Nibal Injection, is an androgen and anabolic steroid (AAS) medication which is used mainly in the treatment of anemia due to bone marrow failure. It is given by injection into muscle. Although it was widely used in the past, the drug has mostly been discontinued and hence is now mostly only available on the black market. A related drug, metenolone acetate, is taken by mouth.

Side effects of metenolone enanthate include symptoms of masculinization like acne, increased hair growth, voice changes, and increased sexual desire. The drug is a synthetic androgen and anabolic steroid and hence is an agonist of the androgen receptor (AR), the biological target of androgens like testosterone and dihydrotestosterone (DHT). It has moderate anabolic effects and weak androgenic effects, as well as no estrogenic effects or risk of liver damage. Metenolone enanthate is a metenolone ester and a long-lasting prodrug of metenolone in the body.

Metenolone enanthate was introduced for medical use in 1962. In addition to its medical use, metenolone enanthate is used to improve physique and performance. The drug is a controlled substance in many countries and so non-medical use is generally illicit. It remains marketed for medical use only in a few countries, such as Spain and Turkey.

== Medical uses ==
Metenolone enanthate has been studied in the treatment of breast cancer.

== Pharmacology ==
=== Pharmacodynamics ===
Androgenic vs. anabolic activity ratio of androgens/anabolic steroids
| Medication | Ratio^{a} |
|---|---|
| Testosterone | ~1:1 |
| Androstanolone (DHT) | ~1:1 |
| Methyltestosterone | ~1:1 |
| Methandriol | ~1:1 |
| Fluoxymesterone | 1:1–1:15 |
| Metandienone | 1:1–1:8 |
| Drostanolone | 1:3–1:4 |
| Metenolone | 1:2–1:3 |
| Oxymetholone | 1:2–1:9 |
| Oxandrolone | 1:13–1:3 |
| Stanozolol | 1:1–1:3 |
| Nandrolone | 1:3–1:16 |
| Ethylestrenol | 1:2–1:19 |
| Norethandrolone | 1:1–1:2 |
Notes: In rodents. Footnotes: ^{a} = Ratio of androgenic to anabolic activity. Sources: See template.

As a derivative of DHT, metenolone, the active form of metenolone enanthate, is not aromatized, and so has no propensity for producing estrogenic side effects like gynecomastia. As an AAS, metenolone enanthate is antigonadotropic and can suppress the hypothalamic–pituitary–gonadal axis and produce reversible hypogonadism and infertility.

=== Pharmacokinetics ===
The biological half-life of metenolone enanthate is reported to be about 10.5 days by intramuscular injection.

Parenteral durations of androgens/anabolic steroids
| Medication | Form | Major brand names | Duration |
|---|---|---|---|
| Testosterone | Aqueous suspension | Andronaq, Sterotate, Virosterone | 2–3 days |
| Testosterone propionate | Oil solution | Androteston, Perandren, Testoviron | 3–4 days |
| Testosterone phenylpropionate | Oil solution | Testolent | 8 days |
| Testosterone isobutyrate | Aqueous suspension | Agovirin Depot, Perandren M | 14 days |
| Mixed testosterone esters^{a} | Oil solution | Triolandren | 10–20 days |
| Mixed testosterone esters^{b} | Oil solution | Testosid Depot | 14–20 days |
| Testosterone enanthate | Oil solution | Delatestryl | 14–28 days |
| Testosterone cypionate | Oil solution | Depovirin | 14–28 days |
| Mixed testosterone esters^{c} | Oil solution | Sustanon 250 | 28 days |
| Testosterone undecanoate | Oil solution | Aveed, Nebido | 100 days |
| Testosterone buciclate^{d} | Aqueous suspension | 20 Aet-1, CDB-1781^{e} | 90–120 days |
| Nandrolone phenylpropionate | Oil solution | Durabolin | 10 days |
| Nandrolone decanoate | Oil solution | Deca Durabolin | 21–28 days |
| Methandriol | Aqueous suspension | Notandron, Protandren | 8 days |
| Methandriol bisenanthoyl acetate | Oil solution | Notandron Depot | 16 days |
| Metenolone acetate | Oil solution | Primobolan | 3 days |
| Metenolone enanthate | Oil solution | Primobolan Depot | 14 days |
Note: All are via i.m. injection. Footnotes: ^{a} = TP, TV, and TUe. ^{b} = TP and TKL. ^{c} = TP, TPP, TiCa, and TD. ^{d} = Studied but never marketed. ^{e} = Developmental code names. Sources: See template.

== Chemistry ==
Metenolone enanthate, or metenolone 17β-enanthate, is a synthetic androstane steroid and a derivative of DHT. It is the C17β enanthate (heptanoate) ester of metenolone, which itself is 1-methyl-δ^{1}-4,5α-dihydrotestosterone (1-methyl-δ^{1}-DHT) or 1-methyl-5α-androst-1-en-17β-ol-3-one.

Structural properties of major anabolic steroid esters
| Anabolic steroid | Structure | Ester | | | | Relative mol. weight | Relative AAS content^{b} | Duration^{c} |
| Anabolic steroid | Structure | Position | Moiety | Type | Length^{a} | Relative mol. weight | Relative AAS content^{b} | Duration^{c} |
|---|---|---|---|---|---|---|---|---|
| Boldenone undecylenate | | C17β | Undecylenic acid | Straight-chain fatty acid | 11 | 1.58 | 0.63 | Long |
| Drostanolone propionate | | C17β | Propanoic acid | Straight-chain fatty acid | 3 | 1.18 | 0.84 | Short |
| Metenolone acetate | | C17β | Ethanoic acid | Straight-chain fatty acid | 2 | 1.14 | 0.88 | Short |
| Metenolone enanthate | | C17β | Heptanoic acid | Straight-chain fatty acid | 7 | 1.37 | 0.73 | Long |
| Nandrolone decanoate | | C17β | Decanoic acid | Straight-chain fatty acid | 10 | 1.56 | 0.64 | Long |
| Nandrolone phenylpropionate | | C17β | Phenylpropanoic acid | Aromatic fatty acid | – (~6–7) | 1.48 | 0.67 | Long |
| Trenbolone acetate | | C17β | Ethanoic acid | Straight-chain fatty acid | 2 | 1.16 | 0.87 | Short |
| Trenbolone enanthate^{d} | | C17β | Heptanoic acid | Straight-chain fatty acid | 7 | 1.41 | 0.71 | Long |
Footnotes: ^{a} = Length of ester in carbon atoms for straight-chain fatty acids or approximate length of ester in carbon atoms for aromatic fatty acids. ^{b} = Relative androgen/anabolic steroid content by weight (i.e., relative androgenic/anabolic potency). ^{c} = Duration by intramuscular or subcutaneous injection in oil solution. ^{d} = Never marketed. Sources: See individual articles.

== History ==
Metenolone enanthate was introduced for medical use in 1962 in the United States under the brand name Nibal Depot. It was soon discontinued in the United States and was marketed instead in Europe in the 1960s and 1970s under the brand name Primobolan Depot.

== Society and culture ==
=== Generic names ===
Methenolone enanthate is the USAN of metenolone enanthate, and methenolone is the BAN of its active form, metenolone. Conversely, metenolone is the INN of metenolone.

=== Brand names ===
Metenolone enanthate is or has been marketed under the brand names Nibal Injection and Primobolan Depot.

=== Availability ===
Metenolone enanthate is marketed in Spain and Turkey.

=== Doping in sports ===
There are known cases of doping in sports with metenolone enanthate by professional athletes.
