= Testosterone propionate/testosterone phenylpropionate/testosterone isocaproate/testosterone decanoate =

Combination drug

TP/TPP/TiC/TD
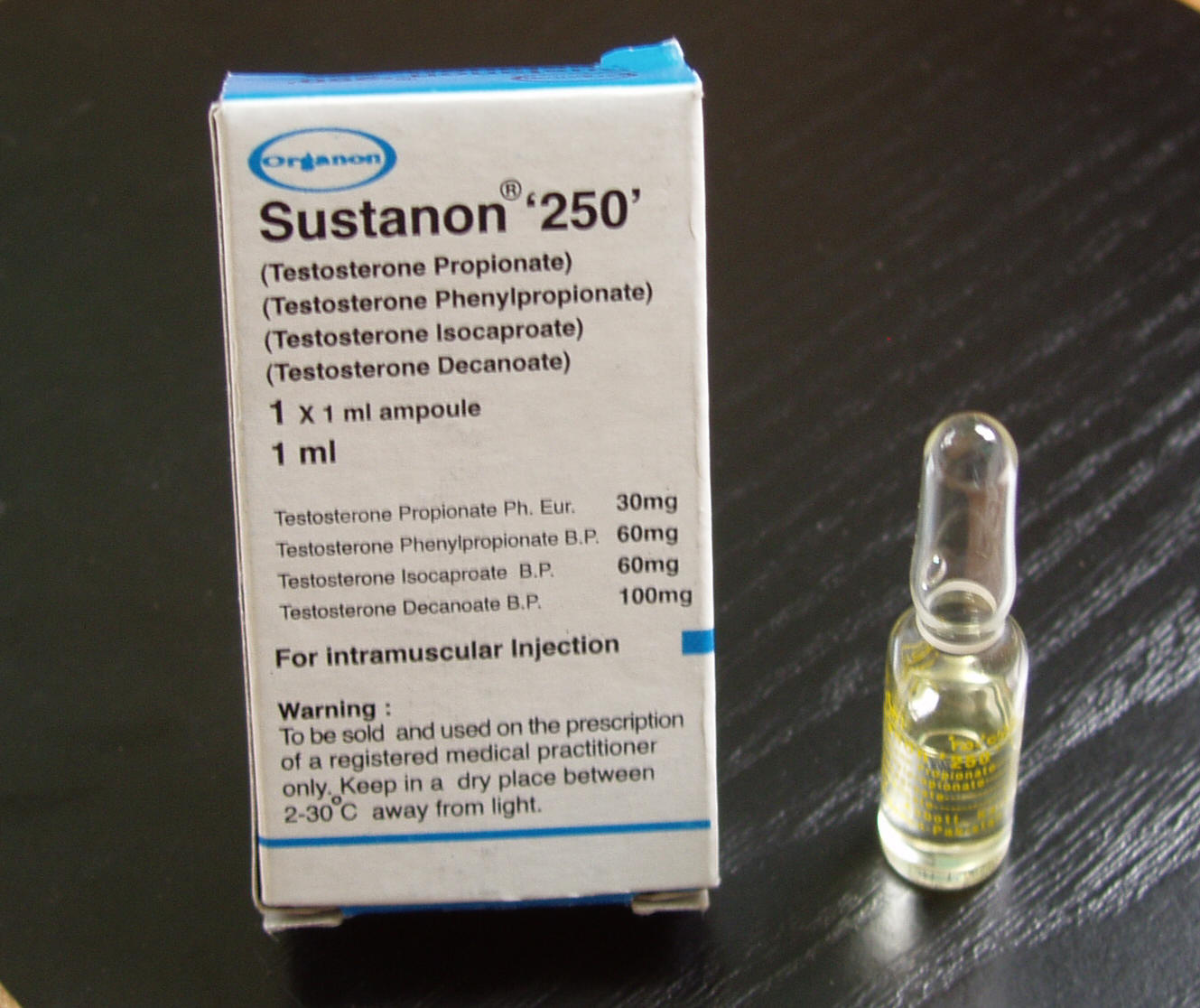

Combination of
- Testosterone propionate: Androgen; Anabolic steroid
- Testosterone phenylpropionate: Androgen; Anabolic steroid
- Testosterone isocaproate: Androgen; Anabolic steroid
- Testosterone decanoate: Androgen; Anabolic steroid

Clinical data
- Trade names: Durandrone Forte, Durateston, Prarbolan, Sustanon 250, Sustanon Prolongatum
- Other names: TP/TPP/TiC/TD
- Routes of administration: Intramuscular injection

Identifiers
- CAS Number: 57-85-2; 1255-49-8
- PubChem CID: 155142
- ChemSpider: 136679
- UNII: WI93Z9138A; 8GN84GWX51

Testosterone propionate/testosterone phenylpropionate/testosterone isocaproate/testosterone decanoate (TP/TPP/TiC/TD), also known as a Sustanon 250 (Organon), is an injectable combination medication of four testosterone esters, all of which are androgens/anabolic steroids.

== Pharmacology ==
The four testosterone esters are as follows;

- 30 mg testosterone propionate
- 60 mg testosterone phenylpropionate
- 60 mg testosterone isocaproate
- 100 mg testosterone decanoate

Cumulatively, a 1 ml of the oil solution contains exactly 250 mg of above mentioned testosterone esters. This particular numerical value is clearly depicted in the name of the product, Sustanon 250.

They are provided as an oil solution and are administered by intramuscular injection. The different testosterone esters provide for different elimination half-lives in the body. Esterification of testosterone provides for a sustained but non-linear release of testosterone hormone from the injection depot into the circulation. Sustanon 100 is administered once every 2 weeks and Sustanon 250 is administered once every 3 to 4 weeks.

Sustanon is the preferred method of testosterone replacement in the United Kingdom as detailed in the British National Formulary. There was a brief shortage of Sustanon 250 during late 2011, due to shifting of manufacturing site, and a further shortage in mid-2012 due to manufacturing problems.

This form of testosterone has long been a popular choice of anabolic steroid among bodybuilders while bulking.

Sustanon is a common perscription for trans men and transmasculine individuals who undergo masculinizing hormone therapy.

== Synonyms/brands ==
- Durateston
- Durandrone Forte
- Sustanon prolongatum
- Prarbolan

== See also ==
- Testosterone propionate/testosterone phenylpropionate/testosterone isocaproate
- Testosterone propionate/testosterone phenylpropionate/testosterone isocaproate/testosterone caproate
- List of combined sex-hormonal preparations § Androgens
