= Testosterone decanoate =

Chemical compound

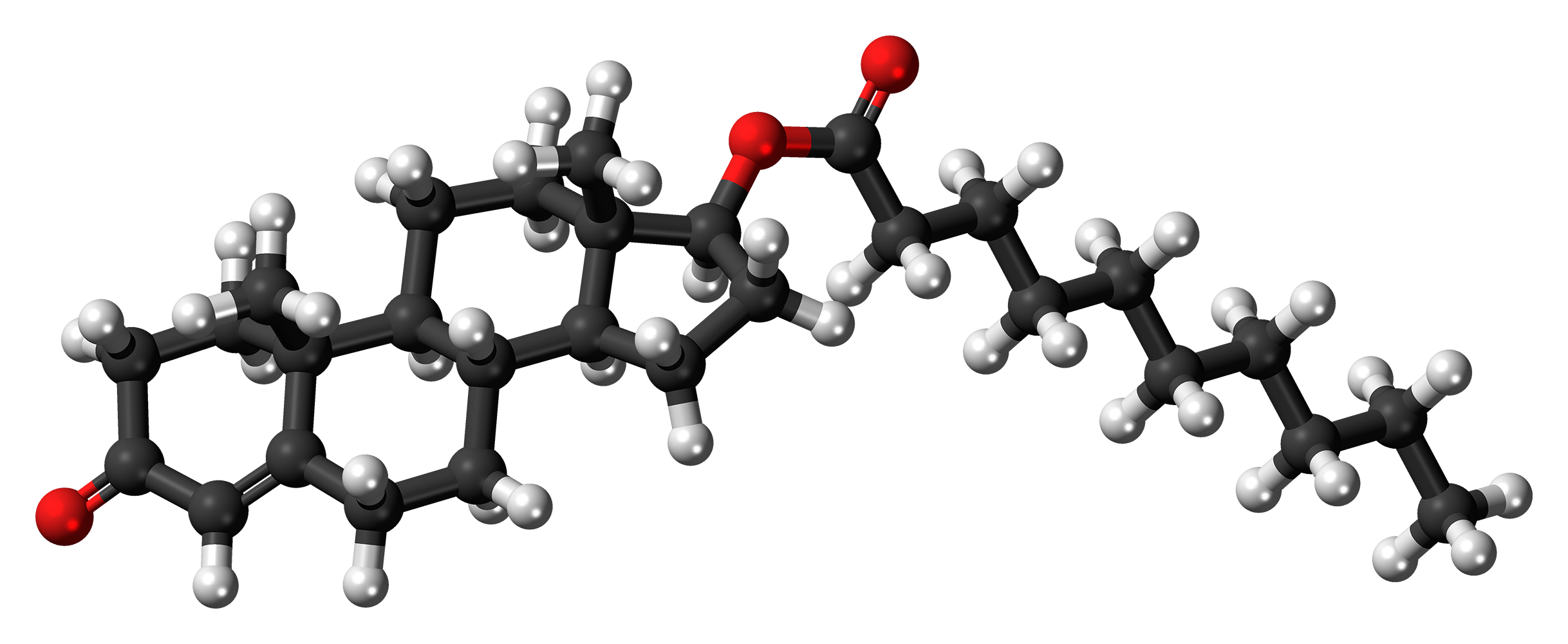

Clinical data
- Other names: Testosterone decylate; Testosterone 17β-decanoate
- Routes of administration: Intramuscular injection

Identifiers
- IUPAC name: [(8R,9S,10R,13S,14S,17S)-10,13-dimethyl-3-oxo-1,2,6,7,8,9,11,12,14,15,16,17-dodecahydrocyclopenta[a]phenanthren-17-yl] decanoate
- CAS Number: 5721-91-5
- PubChem CID: 155143
- DrugBank: DB16001
- ChemSpider: 136680
- UNII: IJW60LAO6S
- KEGG: D08573
- ChEBI: CHEBI:35000
- ChEMBL: ChEMBL1473654
- CompTox Dashboard (EPA): DTXSID5046198
- ECHA InfoCard: 100.024.752

Chemical and physical data
- Formula: C_{29}H_{46}O_{3}
- Molar mass: 442.684 g·mol^{−1}
- 3D model (JSmol): Interactive image
- Melting point: 49.1 °C (120.4 °F)
- SMILES: CCCCCCCCCC(=O)O[C@H]1CC[C@@H]2[C@@]1(CC[C@H]3[C@H]2CCC4=CC(=O)CC[C@]34C)C
- InChI: InChI=1S/C29H46O3/c1-4-5-6-7-8-9-10-11-27(31)32-26-15-14-24-23-13-12-21-20-22(30)16-18-28(21,2)25(23)17-19-29(24,26)3/h20,23-26H,4-19H2,1-3H3/t23-,24-,25-,26-,28-,29-/m0/s1; Key:LBERVHLCXUMDOT-MPZZESAYSA-N

Testosterone decanoate (BAN) is an androgen and anabolic steroid and a testosterone ester. It is a component of Sustanon, along with testosterone propionate, testosterone phenylpropionate, and testosterone isocaproate. The medication has not been marketed as a single-drug preparation. Testosterone decanoate has been investigated as a potential long-acting injectable male contraceptive. It has a longer duration of action than testosterone enanthate, but its duration is not as prolonged as that of testosterone undecanoate.

Parenteral durations of androgens/anabolic steroids
| Medication | Form | Major brand names | Duration |
|---|---|---|---|
| Testosterone | Aqueous suspension | Andronaq, Sterotate, Virosterone | 2–3 days |
| Testosterone propionate | Oil solution | Androteston, Perandren, Testoviron | 3–4 days |
| Testosterone phenylpropionate | Oil solution | Testolent | 8 days |
| Testosterone isobutyrate | Aqueous suspension | Agovirin Depot, Perandren M | 14 days |
| Mixed testosterone esters^{a} | Oil solution | Triolandren | 10–20 days |
| Mixed testosterone esters^{b} | Oil solution | Testosid Depot | 14–20 days |
| Testosterone enanthate | Oil solution | Delatestryl | 14–28 days |
| Testosterone cypionate | Oil solution | Depovirin | 14–28 days |
| Mixed testosterone esters^{c} | Oil solution | Sustanon 250 | 28 days |
| Testosterone undecanoate | Oil solution | Aveed, Nebido | 100 days |
| Testosterone buciclate^{d} | Aqueous suspension | 20 Aet-1, CDB-1781^{e} | 90–120 days |
| Nandrolone phenylpropionate | Oil solution | Durabolin | 10 days |
| Nandrolone decanoate | Oil solution | Deca Durabolin | 21–28 days |
| Methandriol | Aqueous suspension | Notandron, Protandren | 8 days |
| Methandriol bisenanthoyl acetate | Oil solution | Notandron Depot | 16 days |
| Metenolone acetate | Oil solution | Primobolan | 3 days |
| Metenolone enanthate | Oil solution | Primobolan Depot | 14 days |
Note: All are via i.m. injection. Footnotes: ^{a} = TP, TV, and TUe. ^{b} = TP and TKL. ^{c} = TP, TPP, TiCa, and TD. ^{d} = Studied but never marketed. ^{e} = Developmental code names. Sources: See template.

== See also ==
- List of androgen esters § Testosterone esters
