= Testosterone phenylpropionate =

Chemical compound

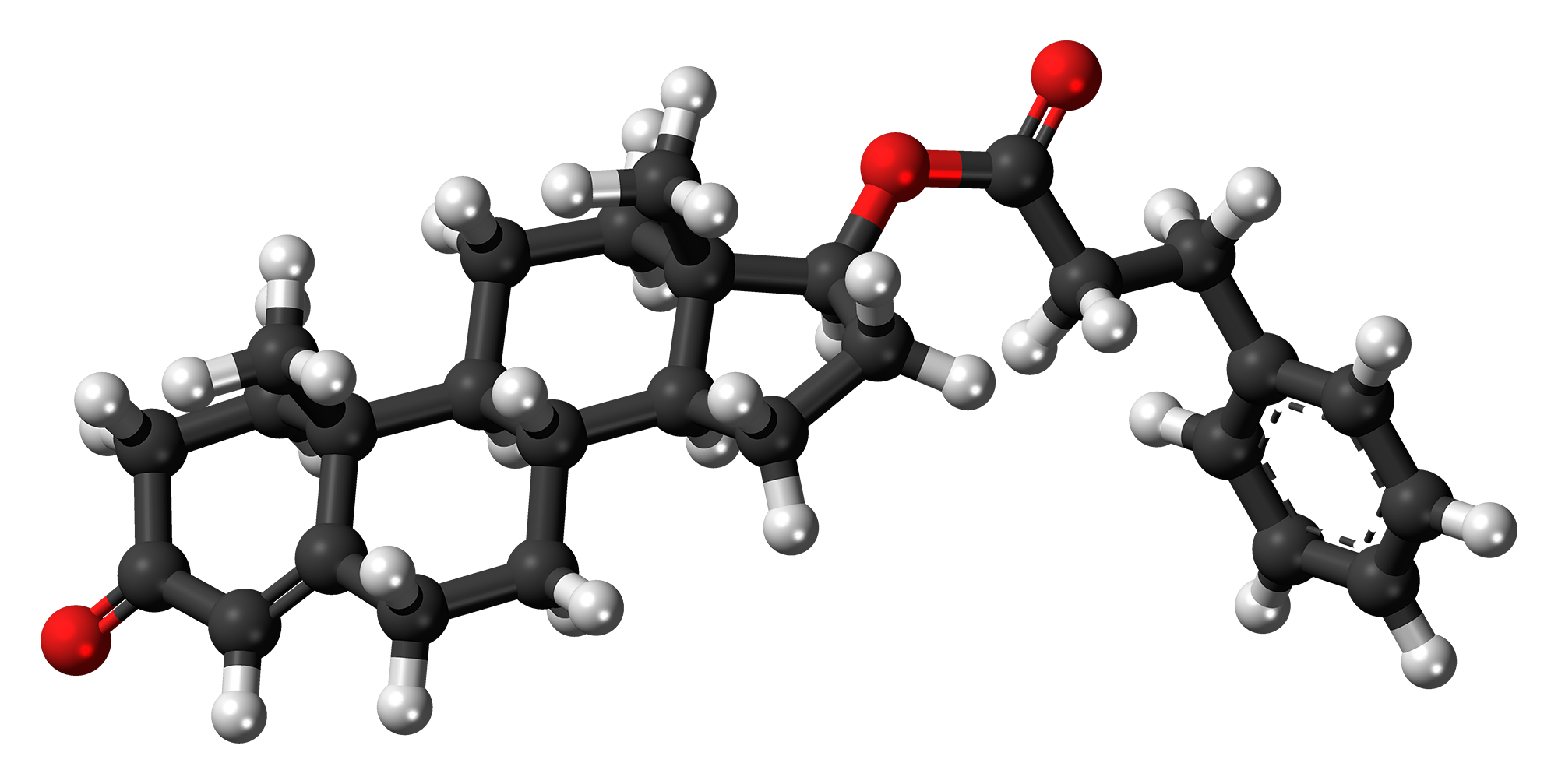

Clinical data
- Trade names: Testolent, Sustanon 100, Sustanon 250, Omnadren 250
- Other names: TPP; Testosterone phenpropionate; Testosterone hydrocinnamate
- Routes of administration: Intramuscular injection

Identifiers
- IUPAC name: [(8R,9S,10R,13S,14S,17S)-10,13-dimethyl-3-oxo-1,2,6,7,8,9,11,12,14,15,16,17-dodecahydrocyclopenta[a]phenanthren-17-yl] 3-phenylpropanoate
- CAS Number: 1255-49-8
- PubChem CID: 14743
- DrugBank: DB16003
- ChemSpider: 14062
- UNII: 8GN84GWX51
- KEGG: D08574
- ChEMBL: ChEMBL2356993
- CompTox Dashboard (EPA): DTXSID5048712
- ECHA InfoCard: 100.013.650

Chemical and physical data
- Formula: C_{28}H_{36}O_{3}
- Molar mass: 420.593 g·mol^{−1}
- 3D model (JSmol): Interactive image
- SMILES: C[C@]12CC[C@H]3[C@H]([C@@H]1CC[C@@H]2OC(=O)CCC4=CC=CC=C4)CCC5=CC(=O)CC[C@]35C
- InChI: InChI=1S/C28H36O3/c1-27-16-14-21(29)18-20(27)9-10-22-23-11-12-25(28(23,2)17-15-24(22)27)31-26(30)13-8-19-6-4-3-5-7-19/h3-7,18,22-25H,8-17H2,1-2H3/t22-,23-,24-,25-,27-,28-/m0/s1; Key:HHSXYDOROIURIP-FEZCWRLCSA-N

Testosterone phenylpropionate (BAN; TPP) (brand name Testolent), or testosterone phenpropionate, also known as testosterone hydrocinnamate, is a synthetic anabolic-androgenic steroid (AAS) and an androgen ester – specifically, the C17β phenylpropionate ester of testosterone – which was formerly marketed in Romania. It was first synthesized in 1951 and was first described in the literature by 1953. The medication was an ingredient of several isolated AAS commercial products, but was never widely used. Testosterone phenylpropionate was also notably a component of Sustanon and Omnadren, as well as of Estandron Prolongatum, Lynandron Prolongatum, and Mixogen. TPP was previously available in Great Britain.

Parenteral durations of androgens/anabolic steroids
Medication	Form	Major brand names	Duration
Testosterone	Aqueous suspension	Andronaq, Sterotate, Virosterone	2–3 days
Testosterone propionate	Oil solution	Androteston, Perandren, Testoviron	3–4 days
Testosterone phenylpropionate	Oil solution	Testolent	8 days
Testosterone isobutyrate	Aqueous suspension	Agovirin Depot, Perandren M	14 days
Mixed testosterone esters^{a}	Oil solution	Triolandren	10–20 days
Mixed testosterone esters^{b}	Oil solution	Testosid Depot	14–20 days
Testosterone enanthate	Oil solution	Delatestryl	14–28 days
Testosterone cypionate	Oil solution	Depovirin	14–28 days
Mixed testosterone esters^{c}	Oil solution	Sustanon 250	28 days
Testosterone undecanoate	Oil solution	Aveed, Nebido	100 days
Testosterone buciclate^{d}	Aqueous suspension	20 Aet-1, CDB-1781^{e}	90–120 days
Nandrolone phenylpropionate	Oil solution	Durabolin	10 days
Nandrolone decanoate	Oil solution	Deca Durabolin	21–28 days
Methandriol	Aqueous suspension	Notandron, Protandren	8 days
Methandriol bisenanthoyl acetate	Oil solution	Notandron Depot	16 days
Metenolone acetate	Oil solution	Primobolan	3 days
Metenolone enanthate	Oil solution	Primobolan Depot	14 days
Note: All are via i.m. injection. Footnotes: ^{a} = TP, TV, and TUe. ^{b} = TP and TKL. ^{c} = TP, TPP, TiCa, and TD. ^{d} = Studied but never marketed. ^{e} = Developmental code names. Sources: See template.

== See also ==
- Nandrolone phenylpropionate
