= Trenbolone acetate =

Chemical compound

Clinical data
- Trade names: Finajet, Finaplix, others
- Other names: RU-1697; Trenbolone 17β-acetate; 19-Nor-δ^{9,11}-testosterone 17β-acetate; Estra-4,9,11-trien-17β-ol-3-one 17β-acetate
- Routes of administration: Intramuscular
- Drug class: Androgen; Anabolic steroid; Androgen ester; Progestogen

Legal status
- Legal status: UK: Class C; US: Schedule III

Pharmacokinetic data
- Elimination half-life: IM: 3 days

Identifiers
- IUPAC name: [(8S,13S,14S,17S)-13-Methyl-3-oxo-2,6,7,8,14,15,16,17-octahydro-1H-cyclopenta[a]phenanthren-17-yl] acetate
- CAS Number: 10161-34-9
- PubChem CID: 66359
- DrugBank: DB14660
- ChemSpider: 17468428
- UNII: RUD5Y4SV0S
- ChEMBL: ChEMBL1698011
- CompTox Dashboard (EPA): DTXSID2046626
- ECHA InfoCard: 100.030.380

Chemical and physical data
- Formula: C_{20}H_{24}O_{3}
- Molar mass: 312.409 g·mol^{−1}
- 3D model (JSmol): Interactive image
- SMILES: CC(=O)O[C@H]1CC[C@@H]2[C@@]1(C=CC3=C4CCC(=O)C=C4CC[C@@H]23)C
- InChI: InChI=1S/C20H24O3/c1-12(21)23-19-8-7-18-17-5-3-13-11-14(22)4-6-15(13)16(17)9-10-20(18,19)2/h9-11,17-19H,3-8H2,1-2H3/t17-,18+,19+,20+/m1/s1; Key:CMRJPMODSSEAPL-FYQPLNBISA-N

Trenbolone acetate, sold under brand names such as Finajet and Finaplix among others, is an androgen and anabolic steroid (AAS) medication used in veterinary medicine, specifically to increase the profitability of livestock by promoting muscle growth in cattle. It is given by injection into muscle.

Side effects of trenbolone acetate include symptoms of masculinization like acne, increased body hair growth, scalp hair loss, voice changes, and increased sexual desire. The drug is a synthetic androgen and anabolic steroid and hence is an agonist of the androgen receptor (AR), the biological target of androgens like testosterone and dihydrotestosterone (DHT). It has strong anabolic effects and highly androgenic effects, as well as potent progestogenic effects, and weak glucocorticoid effects. Trenbolone acetate is an androgen ester and a short-lasting prodrug of trenbolone in the body.

Trenbolone acetate was discovered in 1963 and was introduced for veterinary use in the early 1970s. In addition to its veterinary use, trenbolone acetate is used to improve physique and performance, for which purpose it is purchased from black market suppliers. The drug is a controlled substance in many countries and so non-veterinary use is generally illicit.

== Uses ==
=== Veterinary uses ===
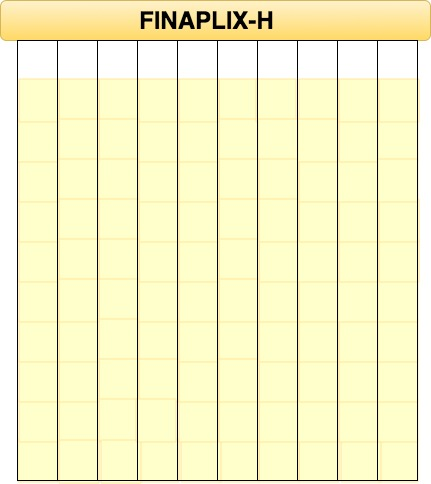
A single cartridge of Finaplix-H containing 10 implants. Each implant contains 10 small yellow pellets. (Image Adapted from Medi-Vet Animal Health, LLC (https://www.medi-vet.com/Finaplix-H-p/16301.html)).

In the livestock industry, trenbolone acetate is more often called Finaplix. It was intentionally developed to promote androgen and gain muscle mass in cattle. Due to its properties, this allows livestock to grow as much muscle as possible before they are transported to a slaughterhouse.

Methyl cellulose and yellow dye are usually present in pellets given to livestock. A single dosage generally consists of ten pellets, and a package of Finaplix usually consists of one cartridge containing one hundred pellets. The medication is administered by subcutaneous injection into the posterior ear using an implanter gun. Finaplix is consistently implanted until the animal is ready to be slaughtered. There is no withholding period. Due to the common practice of trenbolone acetate use in veterinary medicine, it is quite common to find traces of trenbolone metabolites in cattle worldwide.

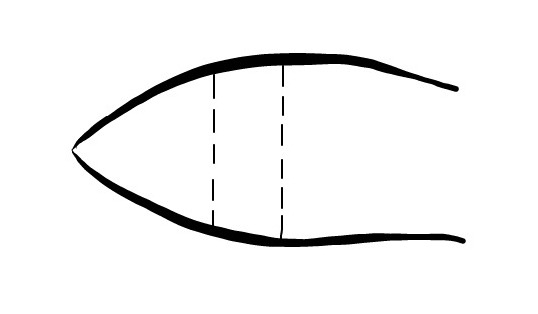
Image showing the general area of the implantation of Finaplix-H pellets displayed on bovine ear.

=== Non-medical uses ===
==== Bodybuilding ====
Trenbolone acetate has never been approved for use in humans (but another ester of Trenbolone called Trenbolone hexahydrobenzylcarbonate was, for a short period of time under the name “Parabolan”, during the 1980s, up until its discontinuation in 1997.) therefore guidelines for human consumption do not exist. However, athletes and bodybuilders have been using trenbolone acetate as a physique- and performance-enhancing drug for decades. Some argue there are many benefits for bodybuilders using trenbolone acetate as an AAS. Unlike exogenous testosterone, trenbolone acetate does not cause fluid retention, so bodybuilders appear leaner; therefore, it is more commonly used during preparation for competitive events. Trenbolone acetate does not convert into an estrogenic metabolite; thus there are no estrogenic side effects. Trenbolone enanthate is a commonly used AAS and lasts much longer than trenbolone acetate with intramuscular injection.

=== Medical uses ===
Trenbolone acetate was never approved for use in humans and hence has no medical uses. However, as an AAS, it would be expected to be effective for treating indications in which other AAS are useful, such as androgen deficiency, wasting syndromes, muscle atrophy, and certain types of anemia.

Trenbolone hexahydrobenzylcarbonate was previously produced for human use by Negma Pharmaceuticals of France in 1.5 ml ampoules containing 76.5 mg of the steroid.

== Side effects ==
Trenbolone acetate, like any other AAS, has many side effects. Its strong androgenic properties stimulate virilization, making it unsuitable for women pursuing physique or performance enhancement. The side effects of trenbolone acetate are similar to other AAS; however, the negative side effects specific to trenbolone acetate are as follows:

=== Androgenic ===
Trenbolone acetate has androgenic activity. Common side effects include oily skin, acne, seborrhea, increased facial or body hair growth, and accelerated scalp hair loss. Severity of these side effects varies based on an individual's genetics. Men susceptible to hair loss have a higher chance of becoming permanently bald. In women, voice deepening, hirsutism, clitoral enlargement, and general virilization may occur.

=== Hypogonadism ===
Trenbolone acetate contributes greatly to development of muscle mass and feed efficiency; however, administration of any AAS suppresses natural testosterone production and therefore has the potential to cause hypogonadism.

=== Cardiovascular ===
Administration of any AAS can lead to cardiovascular issues. Trenbolone acetate can have a strongly negative impact on cholesterol levels by suppressing high-density lipoprotein (HDL) cholesterol production and stimulating low-density lipoprotein (LDL) cholesterol production. When compared to oral AAS, trenbolone acetate exerts a stronger negative effect on cholesterol levels.

=== "Tren cough" ===
The exact mechanisms underlying "tren cough" are not known; however, trenbolone acetate's androgenic effect activates a variety of lipid-like active compounds called prostaglandins, many of which are inflammatory and vasoconstrictive. Prostaglandins act on two signaling pathways: cyclooxygenase (COX) (also known as prostaglandin-endoperoxide synthase) and lipoxygenase (LOX) (EC 1.13.11.34, EC 1.13.11.33, etc.). The bradykinin peptide is well known to promote a cough reaction associated with ACE inhibitors prescribed for hypertension.

=== Estrogenic and progestogenic ===
Trenbolone is not estrogenic; therefore, use does not lead to excess fluid retention. However, due to trenbolone's potent progestogenic activity (it binds with high affinity to the progesterone receptor), gynecomastia, characterized by development and swelling of breast tissue, may occur.

== Pharmacology ==
=== Pharmacodynamics ===
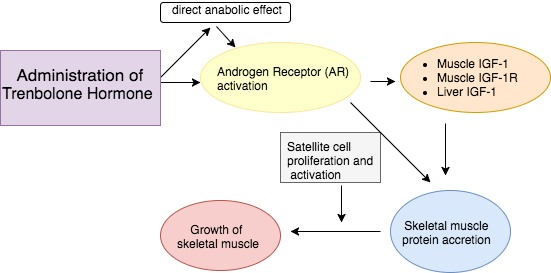
The administration of the trenbolone hormone promotes a direct anabolic effect on Androgen Receptor (AR) activity. AR activity facilitated by trenbolone contributes to an increase in IGF-1 and IGF-1R levels, which then enhances skeletal muscle protein accretion. Activation and proliferation of satellite cells then facilitate an increase in skeletal muscle growth.

Trenbolone acetate is a prodrug of trenbolone. Like other AAS, trenbolone is an agonist of the androgen receptor (AR) and hence has anabolic and androgenic activity as well as antigonadotropic activity. The potency of Trenbolone is not known, although it's often falsely believed to be five times higher than testosterone. This is based on a book by William Llewellyn but has not been definitively proven. Trenbolone was never approved for human use, and therefore limited data on the subject exists. The available research is mostly in rats, which makes the 500/100 potency number inaccurate, as rats respond differently to, and are less sensitive to, androgens. While some literature reports a 5-fold higher potency, two other scientific reviews report a 3-fold higher potency, which makes it unclear how large the relative potency actually is. Trenbolone is an agonist of the progesterone receptor (PR), and in relation to this, has moderate to strong progestogenic activity. Conversely, trenbolone acetate is not a substrate for aromatase and hence lacks estrogenic activity. The compound also has weak glucocorticoid activity.

Similar to many other AAS, trenbolone acetate has the capability to produce insulin-like growth factor-1 (IGF-1). This naturally produced protein-based hormone affects every cell in the body of an organism and plays a large role in muscle recovery and rejuvenation. Extreme muscle growth and cell splitting compared is facilitated through trenbolone acetate administration when compared to other AAS. The facilitation of IGF-1 plays a significant role in the functions and properties of the central nervous system, pulmonary system, muscle tissue, ligaments, cartilage, and tendons.

Trenbolone acetate also has the ability to increase red blood cell count. With a larger amount of red blood cells, blood oxygenation is enhanced. This allows for enhanced muscular endurance and therefore promotes a faster rate of recovery. Trenbolone acetate is capable of inhibiting glucocorticoids such as cortisol. The properties of glucocorticoid are the opposite of androgens as muscle tissue depletion and fat gain is promoted. Administration of trenbolone acetate aims at decreasing the production of glucocorticoid hormones. Trenbolone acetate’s contribution to feed efficiency, also known as nutrient efficiency is what makes it an attractive AAS used for agricultural purposes. Food is one of the most anabolic substances that any living organism can consume, and therefore with the administration of trenbolone acetate, every nutrient in the body becomes a lot more valuable. This facilitates an organism's body that is exposed to the AAS to make better use of the nutrients already consumed.

=== Pharmacokinetics ===
The acetate ester of trenbolone acetate allows for slow release post injection. This ester gives trenbolone an activated elimination half-life of about 3 days.

== Chemistry ==
Trenbolone acetate, or trenbolone 17β-acetate, is a synthetic estrane steroid and a derivative of nandrolone (19-nortestosterone). It is the C17β acetate ester of trenbolone, which itself is δ^{9,11}-19-nortestosterone (δ^{9,11}-19-NT) or estra-4,9,11-trien-17β-ol-3-one. Other trenbolone esters include trenbolone enanthate, trenbolone hexahydrobenzylcarbonate, and trenbolone undecanoate.

Structural properties of major anabolic steroid esters
Anabolic steroid	Structure	Ester				Relative mol. weight	Relative AAS content^{b}	Duration^{c}
Anabolic steroid	Structure	Position	Moiety	Type	Length^{a}	Relative mol. weight	Relative AAS content^{b}	Duration^{c}
Boldenone undecylenate		C17β	Undecylenic acid	Straight-chain fatty acid	11	1.58	0.63	Long
Drostanolone propionate		C17β	Propanoic acid	Straight-chain fatty acid	3	1.18	0.84	Short
Metenolone acetate		C17β	Ethanoic acid	Straight-chain fatty acid	2	1.14	0.88	Short
Metenolone enanthate		C17β	Heptanoic acid	Straight-chain fatty acid	7	1.37	0.73	Long
Nandrolone decanoate		C17β	Decanoic acid	Straight-chain fatty acid	10	1.56	0.64	Long
Nandrolone phenylpropionate		C17β	Phenylpropanoic acid	Aromatic fatty acid	– (~6–7)	1.48	0.67	Long
Trenbolone acetate		C17β	Ethanoic acid	Straight-chain fatty acid	2	1.16	0.87	Short
Trenbolone enanthate^{d}		C17β	Heptanoic acid	Straight-chain fatty acid	7	1.41	0.71	Long
Footnotes: ^{a} = Length of ester in carbon atoms for straight-chain fatty acids or approximate length of ester in carbon atoms for aromatic fatty acids. ^{b} = Relative androgen/anabolic steroid content by weight (i.e., relative androgenic/anabolic potency). ^{c} = Duration by intramuscular or subcutaneous injection in oil solution. ^{d} = Never marketed. Sources: See individual articles.

=== Structure–activity relationships ===
Trenbolone acetate is a modified form of nandrolone. The structure of trenbolone acetate is a 19-nor classification, which represents a structural change of the testosterone hormone. Trenbolone acetate lacks a carbon atom at the 19 position and carries a double bond at carbons 9 and 11. The position of these carbons slows its metabolism, which greatly increases its binding affinity to the AR, and inhibits it from undergoing aromatization into the corresponding estrogenic metabolite. Trenbolone acetate contains trenbolone modified with the addition of a carboxylic acid ester (acetic acid) at the 17β-hydroxyl group. This facilitates the slow release of the AAS from the area of injection.

== History ==
Trenbolone acetate was first synthesized in 1963 and approved by the livestock industry as a growth promoter for beef cattle in the early 1970s. During this period of its first administration, trenbolone acetate was sold under the names Finajet and Finaject. The original manufacturer of trenbolone acetate discontinued during the late 1980s and administered the synthesis of subcutaneous pellets called Finaplix. These pellets aimed to increase muscle mass and lean tissue of cattle prior to slaughter to increase the profitability of livestock when measured in total pounds of meat sold.

The drug appears to have been an early development project of Roussel Uclaf, a French pharmaceutical company, and by the early 1970s, it was being sold as an injectable. There are a number of trenbolone esters but trenbolone acetate is the only one known to be produced in veterinary AAS manufacturers.

Trenbolone acetate became popular among bodybuilders and athletes during the early 1980s. During this period, the AAS was transported illegally from Europe in large quantities. Although trenbolone acetate was very popular for a short amount of time, the large amounts of supplies were discontinued in 1987. This decision was based upon the public concern of sports doping and its negative effects on athletes.

== Society and culture ==
=== Generic names ===
Trenbolone acetate is the generic name of the drug and its USAN, USP, and BANM.

=== Brand names ===
Trenbolone acetate is or has been sold alone for veterinary use under the brand names Component TH, Component TS, Finaject, Finajet, Finaplix-H, and Finaplix-S. It is or has also been sold in combination with estradiol or estradiol benzoate for veterinary use under the brand names Revalor and Synovex.

=== Distribution and regulation ===
Trenbolone acetate, specifically referred to as Finaplix in the livestock industry, is available to purchase in veterinary drug markets. A typical cartridge usually comes in the form of 20 mg pellets. It generally comes in the form of implant pellets containing 20 mg of trenbolone acetate each. Preparations containing trenbolone acetate remain rare since its decline in production after the 1980s. Using AAS for any other purpose, or without a doctor's prescription, is illegal in most countries. Major sporting and bodybuilding organizations ban the use of controlled AAS, and the possession or sale of drugs can lead to arrest and conviction of drug-trafficking in many countries, including the United States and Australia. However, in the United Kingdom and Canada, owning AAS for personal use as a bodybuilding supplement is not illegal, but selling the AAS without a valid medical license or reason is still against the law.

=== Doping in sports ===
Regardless of their legality, AAS are still banned by most sporting leagues in the country, who routinely conduct drug tests to find the users of any AAS. There are known cases of doping in sports with trenbolone acetate by professional athletes.
