= Metenolone acetate =

Chemical compound

Clinical data
- Trade names: Primobolan, Primobolan S, Primonabol, Nibal
- Other names: Methenolone acetate; NSC-74226; SH-567; SQ-16496; Methenolone 17β-acetate; 1-Methyl-δ^{1}-4,5α-dihydrotestosterone 17β-acetate; 1-Methyl-δ^{1}-DHT acetate; 1-Methylandrost-1,4-dien-17β-ol-3-one 17β-acetate
- Routes of administration: By mouth
- Drug class: Androgen; Anabolic steroid; Androgen ester

Identifiers
- IUPAC name: [(5S,8R,9S,10S,13S,14S,17S)-1,10,13-Trimethyl-3-oxo-4,5,6,7,8,9,11,12,14,15,16,17-dodecahydrocyclopenta[a]phenanthren-17-yl] acetate
- CAS Number: 434-05-9
- PubChem CID: 252372
- ChemSpider: 221129
- UNII: W75590VPKQ
- CompTox Dashboard (EPA): DTXSID40963004
- ECHA InfoCard: 100.006.453

Chemical and physical data
- Formula: C_{22}H_{32}O_{3}
- Molar mass: 344.495 g·mol^{−1}
- 3D model (JSmol): Interactive image
- SMILES: CC1=CC(=O)C[C@H]2[C@]1([C@H]3CC[C@]4([C@H]([C@@H]3CC2)CC[C@@H]4OC(=O)C)C)C
- InChI: InChI=1S/C22H32O3/c1-13-11-16(24)12-15-5-6-17-18-7-8-20(25-14(2)23)21(18,3)10-9-19(17)22(13,15)4/h11,15,17-20H,5-10,12H2,1-4H3/t15-,17-,18-,19-,20-,21-,22-/m0/s1; Key:PGAUJQOPTMSERF-QWQRBHLCSA-N

Metenolone acetate, or methenolone acetate, sold under the brand names Primobolan and Nibal, is an androgen and anabolic steroid (AAS) medication which is used mainly in the treatment of anemia due to bone marrow failure. It is taken by mouth. Although it was widely used in the past, the drug has mostly been discontinued and hence is now mostly no longer available. A related drug, metenolone enanthate, is given by injection into muscle.

Side effects of metenolone acetate include symptoms of masculinization like acne, increased hair growth, voice changes, and increased sexual desire. The drug is a synthetic androgen and anabolic steroid and hence is an agonist of the androgen receptor (AR), the biological target of androgens like testosterone and dihydrotestosterone (DHT). It has moderate anabolic effects and weak androgenic effects, as well as no estrogenic effects or risk of liver damage. Metenolone enanthate is a metenolone ester and a prodrug of metenolone in the body.

Metenolone acetate was introduced for medical use in 1961. In addition to its medical use, metenolone acetate is used to improve physique and performance. The drug is a controlled substance in many countries and so non-medical use is generally illicit. It remains marketed for medical use only in a few countries, such as Japan and Moldova.

== Pharmacology ==
Androgenic vs. anabolic activity ratio of androgens/anabolic steroids
Medication	Ratio^{a}
Testosterone	~1:1
Androstanolone (DHT)	~1:1
Methyltestosterone	~1:1
Methandriol	~1:1
Fluoxymesterone	1:1–1:15
Metandienone	1:1–1:8
Drostanolone	1:3–1:4
Metenolone	1:2–1:30
Oxymetholone	1:2–1:9
Oxandrolone	1:3–1:13
Stanozolol	1:1–1:30
Nandrolone	1:3–1:16
Ethylestrenol	1:2–1:19
Norethandrolone	1:1–1:20
Notes: In rodents. Footnotes: ^{a} = Ratio of androgenic to anabolic activity. Sources: See template.

Parenteral durations of androgens/anabolic steroids
Medication	Form	Major brand names	Duration
Testosterone	Aqueous suspension	Andronaq, Sterotate, Virosterone	2–3 days
Testosterone propionate	Oil solution	Androteston, Perandren, Testoviron	3–4 days
Testosterone phenylpropionate	Oil solution	Testolent	8 days
Testosterone isobutyrate	Aqueous suspension	Agovirin Depot, Perandren M	14 days
Mixed testosterone esters^{a}	Oil solution	Triolandren	10–20 days
Mixed testosterone esters^{b}	Oil solution	Testosid Depot	14–20 days
Testosterone enanthate	Oil solution	Delatestryl	14–28 days
Testosterone cypionate	Oil solution	Depovirin	14–28 days
Mixed testosterone esters^{c}	Oil solution	Sustanon 250	28 days
Testosterone undecanoate	Oil solution	Aveed, Nebido	100 days
Testosterone buciclate^{d}	Aqueous suspension	20 Aet-1, CDB-1781^{e}	90–120 days
Nandrolone phenylpropionate	Oil solution	Durabolin	10 days
Nandrolone decanoate	Oil solution	Deca Durabolin	21–28 days
Methandriol	Aqueous suspension	Notandron, Protandren	8 days
Methandriol bisenanthoyl acetate	Oil solution	Notandron Depot	16 days
Metenolone acetate	Oil solution	Primobolan	3 days
Metenolone enanthate	Oil solution	Primobolan Depot	14 days
Note: All are via i.m. injection. Footnotes: ^{a} = TP, TV, and TUe. ^{b} = TP and TKL. ^{c} = TP, TPP, TiCa, and TD. ^{d} = Studied but never marketed. ^{e} = Developmental code names. Sources: See template.

== Chemistry ==
Metenolone acetate, or metenolone 17β-acetate, is a synthetic androstane steroid and a derivative of DHT. It is the C17β acetate ester of metenolone, which itself is 1-methyl-δ^{1}-4,5α-dihydrotestosterone (1-methyl-δ^{1}-DHT) or 1-methyl-5α-androst-1-en-17β-ol-3-one.

Structural properties of major anabolic steroid esters
Anabolic steroid	Structure	Ester				Relative mol. weight	Relative AAS content^{b}	Duration^{c}
Anabolic steroid	Structure	Position	Moiety	Type	Length^{a}	Relative mol. weight	Relative AAS content^{b}	Duration^{c}
Boldenone undecylenate		C17β	Undecylenic acid	Straight-chain fatty acid	11	1.58	0.63	Long
Drostanolone propionate		C17β	Propanoic acid	Straight-chain fatty acid	3	1.18	0.84	Short
Metenolone acetate		C17β	Ethanoic acid	Straight-chain fatty acid	2	1.14	0.88	Short
Metenolone enanthate		C17β	Heptanoic acid	Straight-chain fatty acid	7	1.37	0.73	Long
Nandrolone decanoate		C17β	Decanoic acid	Straight-chain fatty acid	10	1.56	0.64	Long
Nandrolone phenylpropionate		C17β	Phenylpropanoic acid	Aromatic fatty acid	– (~6–7)	1.48	0.67	Long
Trenbolone acetate		C17β	Ethanoic acid	Straight-chain fatty acid	2	1.16	0.87	Short
Trenbolone enanthate^{d}		C17β	Heptanoic acid	Straight-chain fatty acid	7	1.41	0.71	Long
Footnotes: ^{a} = Length of ester in carbon atoms for straight-chain fatty acids or approximate length of ester in carbon atoms for aromatic fatty acids. ^{b} = Relative androgen/anabolic steroid content by weight (i.e., relative androgenic/anabolic potency). ^{c} = Duration by intramuscular or subcutaneous injection in oil solution. ^{d} = Never marketed. Sources: See individual articles.

== History ==
Metenolone acetate was first introduced for medical use in West Germany in 1961 under the brand name Primobolan and in the United States in 1962.

== Society and culture ==
=== Generic names ===
Metenolone acetate is the generic name of the drug and its INN, while methenolone acetate is its USAN and BANM.

=== Brand names ===
Metenolone acetate is or has been marketed under a number of brand names including Primobolan, Primobolan S, Primonabol, and Nibal.

=== Availability ===
Metenolone acetate is marketed in Japan and Moldova.
