= Trenbolone undecanoate =

Chemical compound

Clinical data
- Other names: Trenbolone undecylate; Estra-4,9,11-trien-17β-ol-3-one 17β-undecylate
- Routes of administration: Intramuscular injection
- Drug class: Androgen; Anabolic steroid; Androgen ester; Progestogen

Legal status
- Legal status: UK: Class C; US: Schedule III

Identifiers
- IUPAC name: [(8R,9S,10R,13S,14S,17S)-10,13-dimethyl-3-oxo-1,2,6,7,8,9,11,12,14,15,16,17-dodecahydrocyclopenta[a]phenanthren-17-yl] undecanoate
- CAS Number: 39035-36-4
- PubChem CID: 101803133
- CompTox Dashboard (EPA): DTXSID601337349

Chemical and physical data
- Formula: C_{29}H_{41}O_{3}
- Molar mass: 437.644 g·mol^{−1}
- 3D model (JSmol): Interactive image
- SMILES: O(C(CCCCCCCCCC)=O)[C@]1CC[C@]([H])2[C@@]([H])3CCC4=CC(CCC4=C3C=C[C@@]21C)=O
- InChI: InChI=1S/C29H41O3/c1-3-4-5-6-7-8-9-10-11-28(31)32-27-17-16-26-25-14-12-21-20-22(30)13-15-23(21)24(25)18-19-29(26,27)2/h18-20,25-26H,3-17H2,1-2H3/t25-,26+,29+/m1/s1; Key:DTHSGQSBBRPTMW-ALTZYDRJSA-N

Trenbolone undecanoate, or trenbolone undecylate, is a synthetic injected anabolic–androgenic steroid (AAS) that is a derivative of nandrolone (19-nortestosterone) which was never marketed. It is the C17β undecanoate (undecylate) ester and a long-acting prodrug of trenbolone. The drug was described by researchers at Roussel Uclaf in 1967 and was the first long-lasting ester of trenbolone to be developed. Subsequently, trenbolone hexahydrobenzylcarbonate, a roughly equivalent compound, was developed and approved in Europe for human medical use in 1980, though it was discontinued in 1997. Trenbolone enanthate is another long-lasting ester of trenbolone. Similarly to trenbolone undecanoate, it was never approved for human use, but is sold on the black market for use by bodybuilders and athletes.

== See also ==
- List of androgen esters § Trenbolone esters
