= Boldenone undecylenate =

Chemical compound

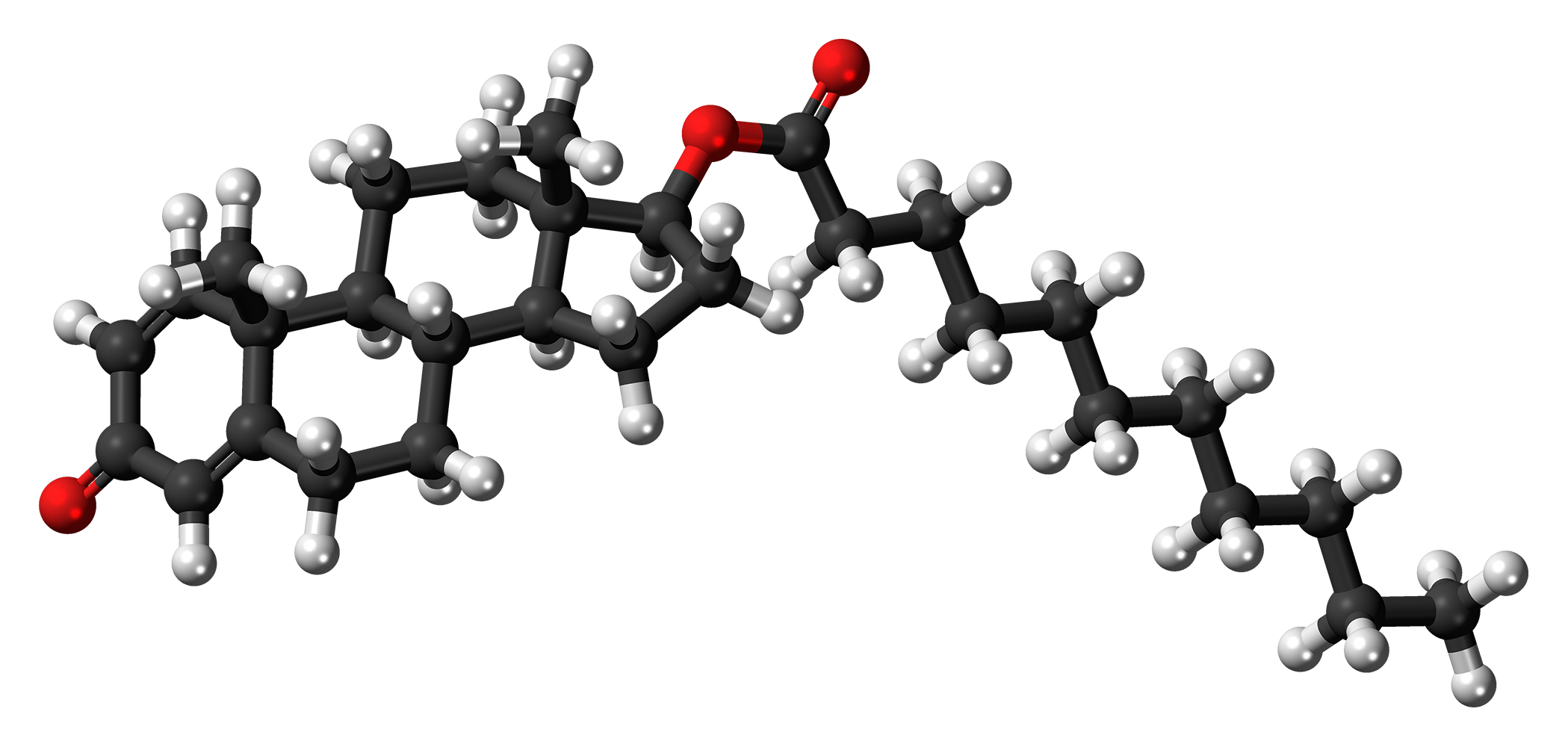

Clinical data
- Trade names: Boldane, Equipoise, Parenabol, others
- Other names: Boldenone undecenoate; Ba 29038; Boldenone 17β-undec-10-enoate; Δ^{1}-Testosterone 17β-undec-10-enoate; 1-Dehydrotestosterone 17β-undec-10-enoate; Androsta-1,4-dien-17β-ol-3-one 17β-undec-10-enoate
- Pregnancy category: AU: X (High risk)
- Routes of administration: Intramuscular injection
- Drug class: Androgen; Anabolic steroid; Androgen ester
- ATC code: None

Legal status
- Legal status: CA: Schedule IV; UK: POM (Prescription only); US: Schedule III

Pharmacokinetic data
- Elimination half-life: Intramuscular: 14 days

Identifiers
- IUPAC name: [(8R,9S,10R,13S,14S,17S)-10,13-Dimethyl-3-oxo-6,7,8,9,11,12,14,15,16,17-decahydrocyclopenta[a]phenanthren-17-yl] undec-10-enoate
- CAS Number: 13103-34-9
- PubChem CID: 11954310
- DrugBank: DBSALT001616
- ChemSpider: 10128605
- UNII: ZS6D2ITA30
- ChEMBL: ChEMBL2106059
- CompTox Dashboard (EPA): DTXSID00156854
- ECHA InfoCard: 100.032.734

Chemical and physical data
- Formula: C_{30}H_{44}O_{3}
- Molar mass: 452.679 g·mol^{−1}
- 3D model (JSmol): Interactive image
- SMILES: C[C@]12CC[C@H]3[C@H]([C@@H]1CC[C@@H]2OC(=O)CCCCCCCCC=C)CCC4=CC(=O)C=C[C@]34C
- InChI: InChI=1S/C30H44O3/c1-4-5-6-7-8-9-10-11-12-28(32)33-27-16-15-25-24-14-13-22-21-23(31)17-19-29(22,2)26(24)18-20-30(25,27)3/h4,17,19,21,24-27H,1,5-16,18,20H2,2-3H3/t24-,25-,26-,27-,29-,30-/m0/s1; Key:AHMMSNQYOPMLSX-CNQKSJKFSA-N

Boldenone undecylenate, or boldenone undecenoate, sold under the brand names Equipoise and Parenabol among others, is an androgen and anabolic steroid (AAS) medication which is used in veterinary medicine, mainly in horses. It was formerly used in humans as well. It is given by injection into muscle.

Side effects of boldenone undecylenate include symptoms of masculinization like acne, increased hair growth, voice changes, and increased sexual desire. The drug is a synthetic androgen and anabolic steroid and hence is an agonist of the androgen receptor (AR), the biological target of androgens like testosterone and dihydrotestosterone (DHT). It has strong anabolic effects and moderate androgenic effects, weak estrogenic effects, and no risk of liver damage. Boldenone undecylenate is an androgen ester and a long-lasting prodrug of boldenone in the body.

Boldenone undecylenate was introduced for medical use in the 1960s. In addition to its medical use, boldenone undecylenate is used to improve physique and performance. The drug is a controlled substance in the United States and its use is generally illicit. It remains marketed for veterinary use in Australia and the United States.

== Uses ==
=== Veterinary ===
Boldenone undecylenate is used in veterinary medicine, mainly in horses.

=== Clinical ===
Boldenone undecylenate was formerly used in clinical medicine in humans, but was discontinued. The drug is currently not approved by Food and Drug Administration. It is also classified as DEA Schedule III controlled substance.

== Pharmacology ==
=== Pharmacodynamics ===
Boldenone undecylenate is a prodrug of boldenone, and hence is an agonist of the androgen receptor. Boldenone has strong anabolic effects and moderate androgenic effects. It also has low estrogenic activity and has little or no progestogenic activity. In relation to the fact that it is not 17α-alkylated, boldenone and boldenone undecylenate have little or no risk of hepatotoxicity.

=== Pharmacokinetics ===
Boldenone undecylenate is a prodrug of boldenone. When administered via intramuscular injection, a depot is formed from which boldenone undecylenate is slowly released into the body and then transformed into boldenone. The drug possess a biological half-life of 14 days when administered by intramuscular injection. Boldenone is a substrate for 5α-reductase and may be converted by this enzyme into 1-testosterone (δ^{1}-dihydrotestosterone, δ^{1}-DHT, dihydroboldenone) in tissues that express it such as the skin, hair follicles, and prostate gland. However, its affinity for this enzyme is said to be extremely low.

== Chemistry ==
Boldenone undecylenate, or boldenone 17β-undec-10-enoate, is a synthetic androstane steroid and a derivative of testosterone. It is the C17β undecylenate (undecenoate) ester of boldenone (δ^{1}-testosterone, 1-dehydrotestosterone, or androsta-1,4-dien-17β-ol-3-one), which itself is the C1(2) dehydrogenated analogue of testosterone and a naturally occurring androgen found in the scent gland of Ilybius fenestratus (a species of aquatic beetle). Boldenone is the non-17α-alkylated variant of metandienone (17α-methyl-δ^{1}-testosterone). An AAS related to boldenone undecylenate is quinbolone (δ^{1}-testosterone 17β-cyclopentenyl enol ether).

Structural properties of major anabolic steroid esters
| Anabolic steroid | Structure | Ester | | | | Relative mol. weight | Relative AAS content^{b} | Duration^{c} |
| Anabolic steroid | Structure | Position | Moiety | Type | Length^{a} | Relative mol. weight | Relative AAS content^{b} | Duration^{c} |
|---|---|---|---|---|---|---|---|---|
| Boldenone undecylenate | | C17β | Undecylenic acid | Straight-chain fatty acid | 11 | 1.58 | 0.63 | Long |
| Drostanolone propionate | | C17β | Propanoic acid | Straight-chain fatty acid | 3 | 1.18 | 0.84 | Short |
| Metenolone acetate | | C17β | Ethanoic acid | Straight-chain fatty acid | 2 | 1.14 | 0.88 | Short |
| Metenolone enanthate | | C17β | Heptanoic acid | Straight-chain fatty acid | 7 | 1.37 | 0.73 | Long |
| Nandrolone decanoate | | C17β | Decanoic acid | Straight-chain fatty acid | 10 | 1.56 | 0.64 | Long |
| Nandrolone phenylpropionate | | C17β | Phenylpropanoic acid | Aromatic fatty acid | – (~6–7) | 1.48 | 0.67 | Long |
| Trenbolone acetate | | C17β | Ethanoic acid | Straight-chain fatty acid | 2 | 1.16 | 0.87 | Short |
| Trenbolone enanthate^{d} | | C17β | Heptanoic acid | Straight-chain fatty acid | 7 | 1.41 | 0.71 | Long |
Footnotes: ^{a} = Length of ester in carbon atoms for straight-chain fatty acids or approximate length of ester in carbon atoms for aromatic fatty acids. ^{b} = Relative androgen/anabolic steroid content by weight (i.e., relative androgenic/anabolic potency). ^{c} = Duration by intramuscular or subcutaneous injection in oil solution. ^{d} = Never marketed. Sources: See individual articles.

== History ==
Boldenone was reportedly patented by Ciba in 1949, and esters of the compound were developed by the company in the 1950s and 1960s. One such ester, boldenone undecylenate, was introduced for clinical use as an injectable AAS under the brand name Parenabol in the 1960s. However, it was discontinued for use in humans in the late 1970s. Squibb introduced boldenone undecylenate for veterinary use under the brand name Equipoise. The medication has been used much more widely in veterinary medicine, in which it has been used mainly in horses, and remains in use today.

== Society and culture ==
=== Generic names ===
Boldenone undecylenate is the generic name of the drug and its USAN, while boldenone undecenoate is its BANM.

=== Brand names ===
Boldenone undecylenate is or has been marketed under a number of brand names including Boldane, Equipoise, Parenabol, and Vebonol among others.

=== Availability ===
Boldenone undecylenate remains marketed for veterinary use in Australia and the United States.

=== Doping in sports ===
There are many known cases of doping in sports with boldenone undecylenate by professional athletes.
