= Drostanolone propionate =

Chemical compound

Clinical data
- Trade names: Drolban, Masteril, Masteron, others
- Other names: Dromostanolone propionate; NSC-12198; Drostanolone 17β-propionate; 2α-Methyl-4,5α-dihydrotestosterone 17β-propionate; 2α-Methyl-DHT propionate; 2α-Methyl-5α-androstan-17β-ol-3-one 17β-propionate
- Pregnancy category: X
- Routes of administration: Intramuscular injection
- Drug class: Androgen; Anabolic steroid; Androgen ester
- ATC code: A14

Legal status
- Legal status: CA: Schedule IV; US: Schedule III

Pharmacokinetic data
- Bioavailability: Oral: 0–2% Intramuscular: 100%
- Protein binding: High
- Metabolism: Hepatic
- Elimination half-life: Intramuscular: 2 days
- Excretion: Urine

Identifiers
- IUPAC name: (2R,5S,8R,9S,10S,13S,14S,17S)-17-hydroxy-2,10,13-trimethyl-1,2,4,5,6,7,8,9,11,12,14,15,16,17-tetradecahydrocyclopenta[a]phenanthren-3-one
- CAS Number: 58-19-5
- PubChem CID: 224004
- IUPHAR/BPS: 6947
- DrugBank: DB00858
- ChemSpider: 194604
- UNII: 7DR7H00HDT
- ChEBI: CHEBI:31523
- CompTox Dashboard (EPA): DTXSID1022972 DTXSID1022971, DTXSID1022972
- ECHA InfoCard: 100.007.550

Chemical and physical data
- Formula: C_{23}H_{36}O_{3}
- Molar mass: 360.538 g·mol^{−1}
- 3D model (JSmol): Interactive image
- SMILES: CCC(=O)O[C@H]1CC[C@@H]2[C@@]1(CC[C@H]3[C@H]2CC[C@@H]4[C@@]3(C[C@H](C(=O)C4)C)C)C
- InChI: InChI=1S/C23H36O3/c1-5-21(25)26-20-9-8-17-16-7-6-15-12-19(24)14(2)13-23(15,4)18(16)10-11-22(17,20)3/h14-18,20H,5-13H2,1-4H3/t14-,15+,16+,17+,18+,20+,22+,23+/m1/s1; Key:NOTIQUSPUUHHEH-UXOVVSIBSA-N

Drostanolone propionate, or dromostanolone propionate, sold under the brand names Drolban, Masteril, and Masteron among others, is an androgen and anabolic steroid (AAS) medication which was used to treat breast cancer in women but is now no longer marketed. It is given by injection into muscle.

Side effects of drostanolone propionate include symptoms of masculinization like acne, increased hair growth, voice changes, and increased sexual desire. It has no risk of liver damage. The drug is a synthetic androgen and anabolic steroid and hence is an agonist of the androgen receptor (AR), the biological target of androgens like testosterone and dihydrotestosterone (DHT). It has moderate anabolic effects and weak androgenic effects, which give it a mild side effect profile and make it especially suitable for use in women. The drug has no estrogenic effects. Drostanolone propionate is an androgen ester and a long-lasting prodrug of drostanolone in the body.

Drostanolone propionate was first described in 1959 and was introduced for medical use in 1961. In addition to its medical use, drostanolone propionate is used to improve physique and performance. The drug is a controlled substance in many countries and so non-medical use is generally illicit.

== Medical uses ==
The principal clinical indication of drostanolone propionate in the United States as well as international markets was the treatment of advanced inoperable breast cancer in women.

Hormonal treatment is part of the complex therapy for some kind of tumors, particularly the ones associated with hormone-active tissues like breast or prostate cancer. Some types of breast cancer cells, expressing estrogen receptors (called ER+ cancers), use estrogen for their growth and dissemination. That is why drugs that block estrogen receptors or decrease their expression on the cell membrane, antiestrogens, could limit the tumor spread and size. Drostanolone propionate has been FDA approved as an antiestrogenic drug for the treatment of breast cancer. By the time of its release, there were not many alternatives for patients with breast cancer and drostanolone propionate was a revolution for these patients. As it has lower androgenic rate compared to testosterone, the risk of virilization is much lighter. Due to this fact, women, who usually do not respond well to any AAS, were having much greater chance to survive cancer. Drostanolone propionate can also be used for breast tumors that do not respond well to other treatments or also as palliative care for advanced incurable tumors. The effects of the product depend of course on the dose and period of administration. The risk of virilization becomes greater with high doses and continuous administration period.

Androgen/anabolic steroid dosages for breast cancer
Route	Medication	Form	Dosage
Oral	Methyltestosterone	Tablet	30–200 mg/day
Oral	Fluoxymesterone	Tablet	10–40 mg 3x/day
Oral	Calusterone	Tablet	40–80 mg 4x/day
Oral	Normethandrone	Tablet	40 mg/day
Buccal	Methyltestosterone	Tablet	25–100 mg/day
Injection (IM or SC)	Testosterone propionate	Oil solution	50–100 mg 3x/week
Injection (IM or SC)	Testosterone enanthate	Oil solution	200–400 mg 1x/2–4 weeks
Injection (IM or SC)	Testosterone cypionate	Oil solution	200–400 mg 1x/2–4 weeks
Injection (IM or SC)	Mixed testosterone esters	Oil solution	250 mg 1x/week
Injection (IM or SC)	Methandriol	Aqueous suspension	100 mg 3x/week
Injection (IM or SC)	Androstanolone (DHT)	Aqueous suspension	300 mg 3x/week
Injection (IM or SC)	Drostanolone propionate	Oil solution	100 mg 1–3x/week
Injection (IM or SC)	Metenolone enanthate	Oil solution	400 mg 3x/week
Injection (IM or SC)	Nandrolone decanoate	Oil solution	50–100 mg 1x/1–3 weeks
Injection (IM or SC)	Nandrolone phenylpropionate	Oil solution	50–100 mg/week
Note: Dosages are not necessarily equivalent. Sources: See template.

== Non-medical uses ==
Drostanolone propionate is or has been used for physique- and performance-enhancing purposes by competitive athletes, bodybuilders, and powerlifters.

== Side effects ==
Drostanolone propionate produces considerably less virilization in women compared to equal doses of testosterone propionate. However, since the given dosage for breast cancer was relatively high (200 mg/twice a week), mild virilization including oily skin, acne, voice deepening, hirsutism, and clitoral enlargement could still occur, and marked virilization could manifest with long-term therapy. The drug has no estrogenic activity and hence has no propensity for causing gynecomastia (in males) or fluid retention. Drostanolone propionate is not known to pose a risk of hepatotoxicity.

== Pharmacology ==
=== Pharmacodynamics ===
Androgenic vs. anabolic activity ratio of androgens/anabolic steroids
Medication	Ratio^{a}
Testosterone	~1:1
Androstanolone (DHT)	~1:1
Methyltestosterone	~1:1
Methandriol	~1:1
Fluoxymesterone	1:1–1:15
Metandienone	1:1–1:8
Drostanolone	1:3–1:4
Metenolone	1:2–1:3
Oxymetholone	1:2–1:9
Oxandrolone	1:13–1:3
Stanozolol	1:1–1:3
Nandrolone	1:3–1:16
Ethylestrenol	1:2–1:19
Norethandrolone	1:1–1:2
Notes: In rodents. Footnotes: ^{a} = Ratio of androgenic to anabolic activity. Sources: See template.

Drostanolone propionate is a prodrug of drostanolone. Like other AAS, drostanolone is an agonist of the androgen receptor (AR). It is not a substrate for 5α-reductase and is a poor substrate for 3α-hydroxysteroid dehydrogenase (3α-HSD), and therefore shows a high ratio of anabolic to androgenic activity. As a DHT derivative, drostanolone is not a substrate for aromatase and hence cannot be aromatized into estrogenic metabolites. While no data are available on the progestogenic activity of drostanolone, it is thought to have low or no such activity similarly to other DHT derivatives. Since the drug is not 17α-alkylated, it is not known to cause hepatotoxicity.

Drostanolone propionate, via its active form drostanolone, interacts with the AR and activates a cascade of genetic changes, including increased protein synthesis (anabolism) and decreased amino acid degradation (catabolism). It also induces a reduction or inhibition of prolactin or estrogen receptors in the breasts, which is linked to its antitumor effects.

=== Pharmacokinetics ===
Drostanolone propionate is not active via the oral route and must be administered via intramuscular injection. The elimination half-life of the drug via this route is approximately 2 days. It has a much longer elimination half-life via intramuscular injection than drostanolone. Drostanolone propionate is metabolized into drostanolone, which is the active form.

== Chemistry ==
Drostanolone propionate, or drostanolone 17β-propionate, is a synthetic androstane steroid and a derivative of DHT. It is the C17β propionate (propanoate) ester of drostanolone, which itself is 2α-methyl-4,5α-dihydrotestosterone (2α-methyl-DHT) or 2α-methyl-5α-androstan-17β-ol-3-one.

Structural properties of major anabolic steroid esters
Anabolic steroid	Structure	Ester				Relative mol. weight	Relative AAS content^{b}	Duration^{c}
Anabolic steroid	Structure	Position	Moiety	Type	Length^{a}	Relative mol. weight	Relative AAS content^{b}	Duration^{c}
Boldenone undecylenate		C17β	Undecylenic acid	Straight-chain fatty acid	11	1.58	0.63	Long
Drostanolone propionate		C17β	Propanoic acid	Straight-chain fatty acid	3	1.18	0.84	Short
Metenolone acetate		C17β	Ethanoic acid	Straight-chain fatty acid	2	1.14	0.88	Short
Metenolone enanthate		C17β	Heptanoic acid	Straight-chain fatty acid	7	1.37	0.73	Long
Nandrolone decanoate		C17β	Decanoic acid	Straight-chain fatty acid	10	1.56	0.64	Long
Nandrolone phenylpropionate		C17β	Phenylpropanoic acid	Aromatic fatty acid	– (~6–7)	1.48	0.67	Long
Trenbolone acetate		C17β	Ethanoic acid	Straight-chain fatty acid	2	1.16	0.87	Short
Trenbolone enanthate^{d}		C17β	Heptanoic acid	Straight-chain fatty acid	7	1.41	0.71	Long
Footnotes: ^{a} = Length of ester in carbon atoms for straight-chain fatty acids or approximate length of ester in carbon atoms for aromatic fatty acids. ^{b} = Relative androgen/anabolic steroid content by weight (i.e., relative androgenic/anabolic potency). ^{c} = Duration by intramuscular or subcutaneous injection in oil solution. ^{d} = Never marketed. Sources: See individual articles.

== History ==
Drostanolone and drostanolone propionate were first described in 1959. The related AAS oxymetholone and methasterone (methyldrostanolone) were first described in the same paper as well. Drostanolone propionate was introduced for medical use in the United States in 1961 and in Europe shortly thereafter.

== Society and culture ==
=== Generic names ===
Drostanolone propionate is the generic name of the drug and its BANM, while dromostanolone propionate is the USAN and USP; there is no INN for this form. The generic name of the unesterified form of the drug is drostanolone or dromostanolone and the former is its INN, BAN, and DCF while there is no USAN.

=== Brand names ===
Drostanolone propionate was marketed under a variety of brand names including Drolban, Masterid, Masteril, Masteron, Masterone, Mastisol, Metormon, Permastril, and Prometholone.

=== Availability ===
Drostanolone propionate appears to no longer be marketed. It was previously available in the United States, Europe, and Japan. In Europe, it was specifically marketed in the United Kingdom, Germany, Belgium, France, Spain, Portugal, Italy, and Bulgaria.

=== Legal status ===
Drostanolone propionate, along with other AAS, is a schedule III controlled substance in the United States under the Controlled Substances Act.
