= Tren =

Tren may refer to:

- Tris(2-aminoethyl)amine, a monomer or coordination chemistry compound
- Trenbolone, a veterinary steroid
- Tren, a 1978 Yugoslav film
- Trenbolone acetate, an anabolic steroid often colloquially referred to as "tren".

== See also ==
- Train
