= 3-phenylpropanoate dioxygenase =

Class of enzymes

Identifiers
- EC no.: 1.14.12.19

Databases
- IntEnz: IntEnz view
- BRENDA: BRENDA entry
- ExPASy: NiceZyme view
- KEGG: KEGG entry
- MetaCyc: metabolic pathway
- PRIAM: profile
- PDB structures: RCSB PDB PDBe PDBsum
Search
- PMC: articles
- PubMed: articles
- NCBI: proteins

3-phenylpropanoate dioxygenase (EC 1.14.12.19) is an enzyme that catalyzes the chemical reaction

phenylpropanoic acid
+ NADH
O_{2} + H^{+}
cis-diol product
+ NAD^{+}

The four substrates of this enzyme are phenylpropanoic acid, reduced nicotinamide adenine dinucleotide (NADH), oxygen, and a proton. Its products are the cis-diol, 3-[(5S,6R)-5,6-dihydroxycyclohexa-1,3-dienyl]propanoic acid, and oxidised NAD^{+}.

This enzyme is an oxidoreductase that uses molecular oxygen as oxidant and incorporates both its atoms into the starting material. The systematic name of this enzyme class is 3-phenylpropanoate,NADH:oxygen oxidoreductase (2,3-hydroxylating). Other names in common use include HcaA1A2CD, Hca dioxygenase, and 3-phenylpropionate dioxygenase. It can catalyse the same reaction in related compounds, for example cinnamic acid.

cinnamic acid
cis-diol product
