= Nandrolone hexyloxyphenylpropionate =

Chemical compound

Clinical data
- Trade names: Anador, Anadur, Anadurine
- Other names: NHPP; 19-Nortestosterone 17β-(3-(4-hexyloxy)phenyl)propionate
- Routes of administration: Intramuscular injection
- Drug class: Androgen; Anabolic steroid; Androgen ester; Progestogen

Pharmacokinetic data
- Elimination half-life: Intramuscular: 20 days

Identifiers
- IUPAC name: [(8R,9S,10R,13S,14S,17S)-13-methyl-3-oxo-2,6,7,8,9,10,11,12,14,15,16,17-dodecahydro-1H-cyclopenta[a]phenanthren-17-yl] 3-(4-hexoxyphenyl)propanoate
- CAS Number: 52279-57-9
- PubChem CID: 92341
- ChemSpider: 83364
- UNII: 602JJC2862
- CompTox Dashboard (EPA): DTXSID20966654
- ECHA InfoCard: 100.052.538

Chemical and physical data
- Formula: C_{33}H_{46}O_{4}
- Molar mass: 506.727 g·mol^{−1}
- 3D model (JSmol): Interactive image
- SMILES: CCCCCCOC1=CC=C(C=C1)CCC(=O)O[C@H]2CC[C@@H]3[C@@]2(CC[C@H]4[C@H]3CCC5=CC(=O)CC[C@H]45)C
- InChI: InChI=1S/C33H46O4/c1-3-4-5-6-21-36-26-12-7-23(8-13-26)9-18-32(35)37-31-17-16-30-29-14-10-24-22-25(34)11-15-27(24)28(29)19-20-33(30,31)2/h7-8,12-13,22,27-31H,3-6,9-11,14-21H2,1-2H3/t27-,28+,29+,30-,31-,33-/m0/s1; Key:PQKRYXHYWWQULJ-JMKYFRMNSA-N

Nandrolone hexyloxyphenylpropionate (NHPP; brand names Anador, Anadur, Anadurine), also known as 19-nortestosterone 17β-(3-(4-hexyloxy)phenyl)propionate, is a synthetic androgen and anabolic steroid and a nandrolone ester that is marketed in France, Denmark, Austria, Luxembourg, and Turkey. It has been studied as a potential long-acting injectable male contraceptive, though it has not been marketed for this indication. Approximately 70% of men became azoospermic, while the remaining men all became oligospermic. NHPP has a mean residence time in the body of 29.1 days and an elimination half-life in the body of 20.1 days.

Relative affinities (%) of nandrolone and related steroids
Compound	PR	AR	ER	GR	MR	SHBG	CBG
Nandrolone	20	154–155	<0.1	0.5	1.6	1–16	0.1
Testosterone	1.0–1.2	100	<0.1	0.17	0.9	19–82	3–8
Estradiol	2.6	7.9	100	0.6	0.13	8.7–12	<0.1
Notes: Values are percentages (%). Reference ligands (100%) were progesterone for the PR, testosterone for the AR, estradiol for the ER, dexamethasone for the GR, aldosterone for the MR, dihydrotestosterone for SHBG, and cortisol for CBG. Sources: See template.

Hormone levels with nandrolone esters by intramuscular injection
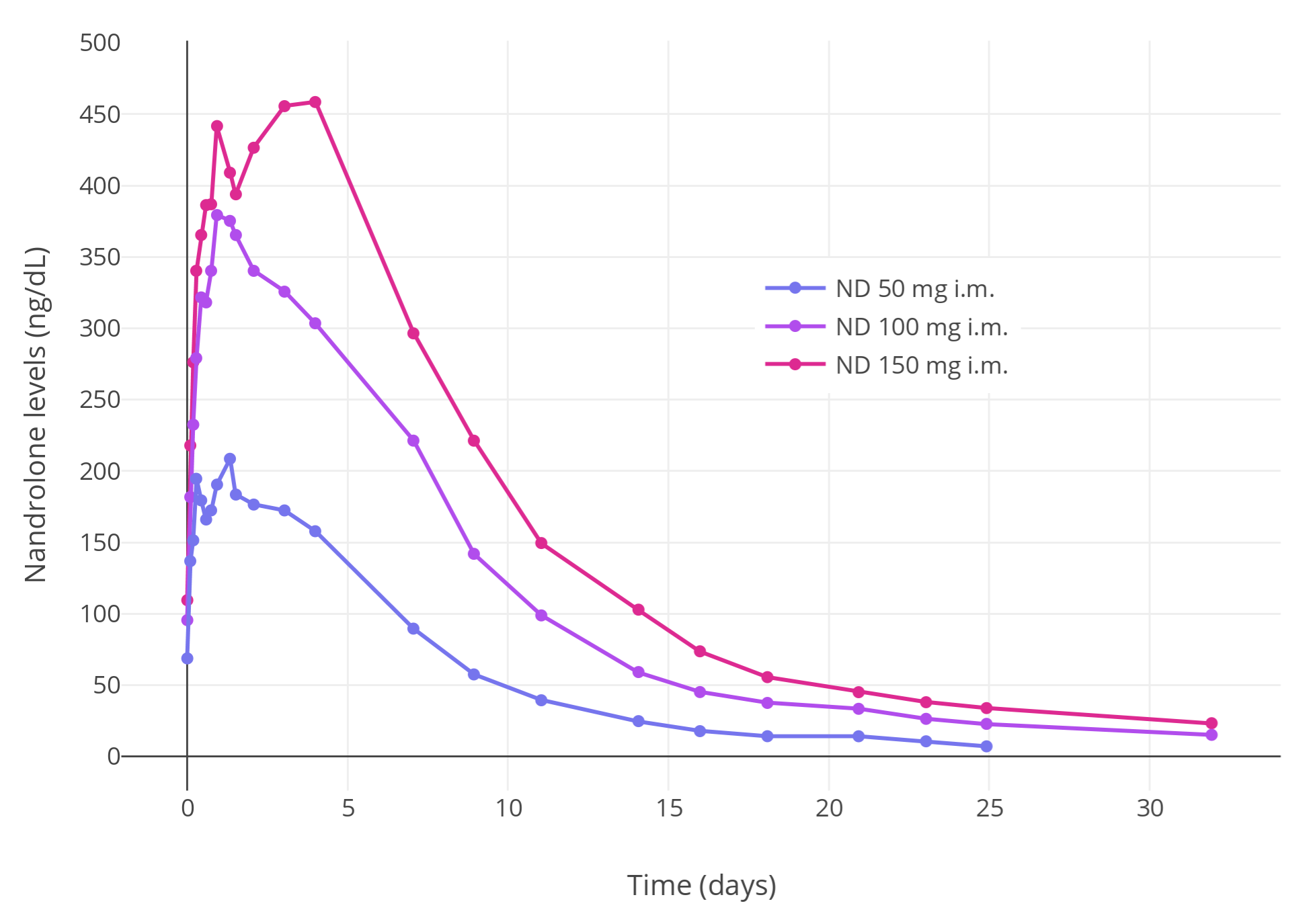
Nandrolone levels after a single 50, 100, or 150 mg intramuscular injection of nandrolone decanoate in oil solution in men.

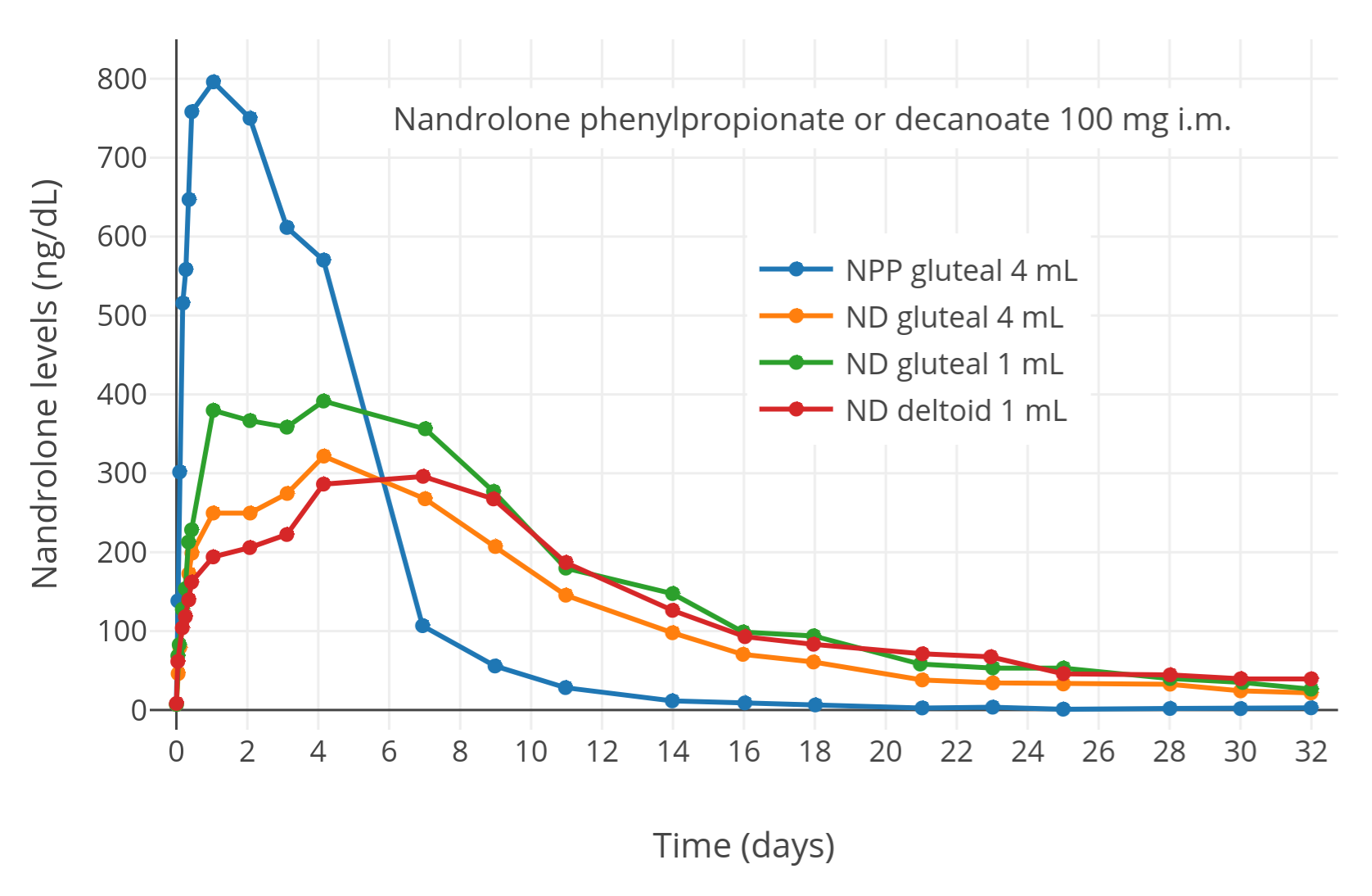
Nandrolone levels after a single 100 mg intramuscular injection of nandrolone decanoate or nandrolone phenylpropionate in 4 mL or 1 mL arachis oil solution into gluteal or deltoid muscle in men.

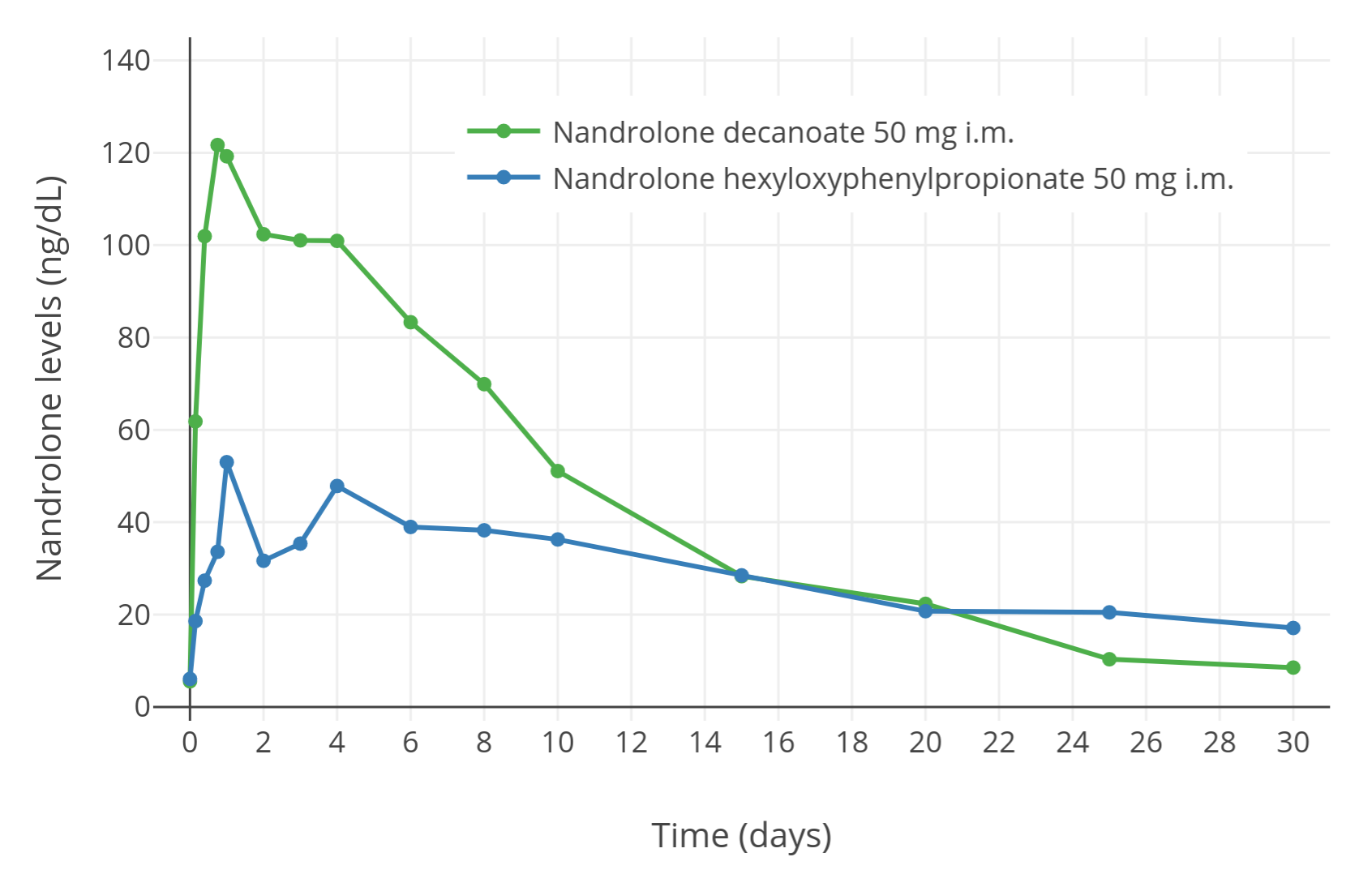
Nandrolone levels with a single 50 mg intramuscular injection of nandrolone decanoate or nandrolone hexyloxyphenylpropionate in oil solution in men.

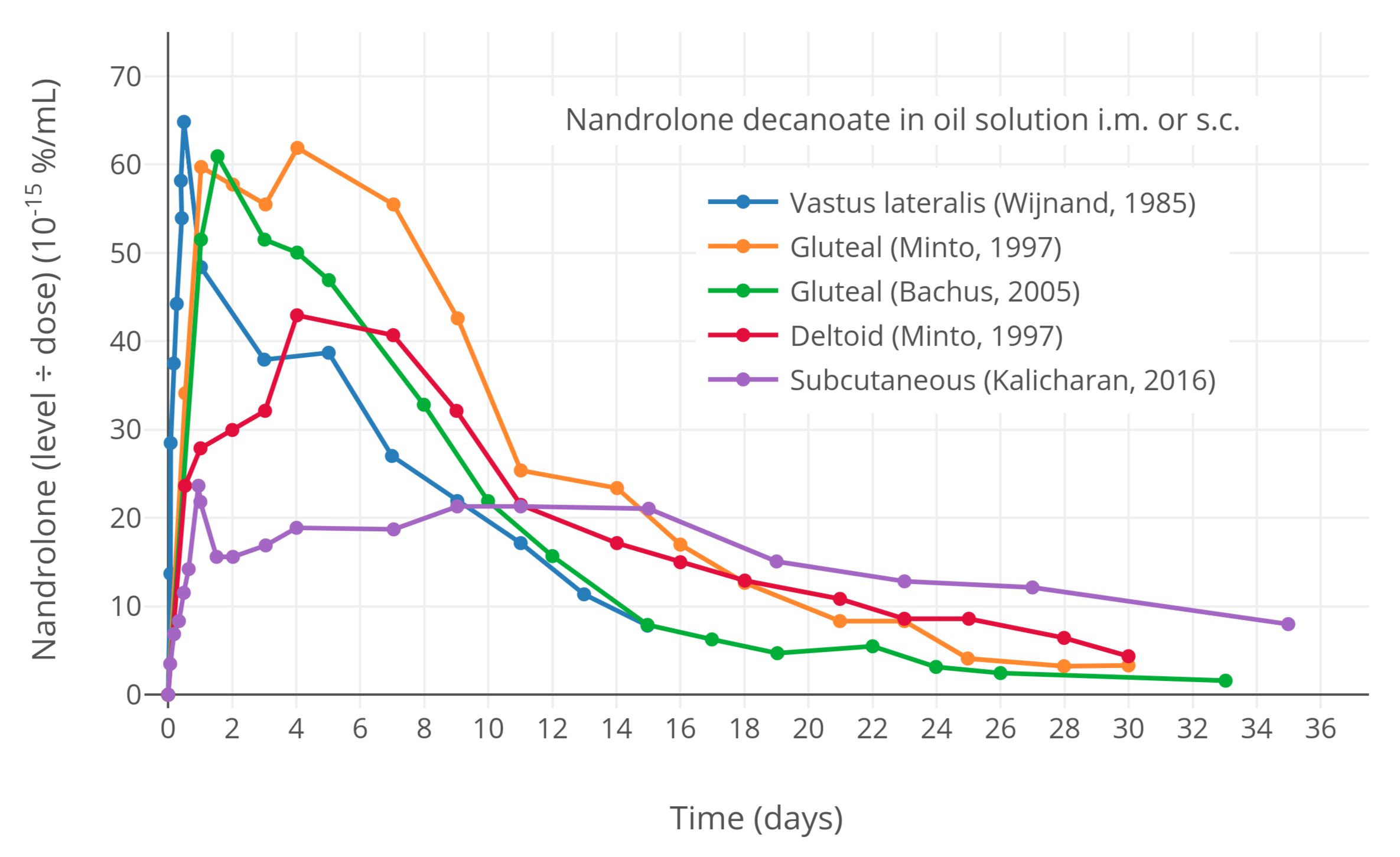
Dose-normalized nandrolone exposure (serum level divided by dose administered) with nandrolone decanoate in oil solution by intramuscular or subcutaneous injection in men.

== See also ==
- List of androgen esters § Nandrolone esters
