= 2-hydroxy-6-oxonona-2,4-dienedioate hydrolase =

Class of enzymes

Identifiers
- EC no.: 3.7.1.14

Databases
- BRENDA: enzyme data
- ExPASy: NiceZyme view
- KEGG: enzyme entry
- MetaCyc: metabolic pathway
- Rhea: reactions
- PDB structures: RCSB PDB PDBe PDBsum
Search
- PMC: articles
- PubMed: articles
- NCBI: proteins

2-hydroxy-6-oxonona-2,4-dienedioate hydrolase (EC 3.7.1.14, mhpC (gene)) is an enzyme characterised from Escherichia coli with systematic name (2Z,4E)-2-hydroxy-6-oxona-2,4-dienedioate succinylhydrolase. It catalyses two related hydrolysis reactions.

The first is part of a pathway for the catabolism of phenylpropanoic acid and its 3-hydroxy derivative which allows the bacterium to grow with these substrates as their sole carbon source. The genes in this pathway have been sequenced. This specific reaction converts (2E,4Z)-2-hydroxy-6-oxonona-2,4-dienedioic acid into Z-2-hydroxypenta-2,4-dienoic acid and succinic acid:

(2E,4Z)-2-hydroxy-6-oxonona-2,4-dienedioic acid
H_{2}O
Z-2-hydroxypenta-2,4-dienoic acid
+
succinic acid

A similar transformation starts from cinnamic acid and derivatives, giving (2E,4Z,7E)-2-hydroxy-6-oxonona-2,4,7-trienedioic acid, which is converted to Z-2-hydroxypenta-2,4-dienoic acid and fumaric acid:

(2E,4Z,7E)-2-hydroxy-6-oxonona-2,4,7-trienedioic acid
H_{2}O
Z-2-hydroxypenta-
2,4-dienoic acid
+
fumaric acid
