= Androgen ester =

Class of chemical compounds

Testosterone undecanoate, an ester of testosterone and one of the most widely used androgen esters.

An androgen or anabolic steroid ester is an ester of an androgen/anabolic steroid (AAS) such as the natural testosterone or dihydrotestosterone (DHT) or the synthetic nandrolone (19-nortestosterone). Esterification renders AAS into metabolism-resistant prohormones of themselves, improving oral bioavailability, increasing lipophilicity, and extending the elimination half-life (which necessitates less frequent administration). In addition, with intramuscular injection, AAS esters are absorbed more slowly into the body, thus further improving the elimination half-life. Aside from differences in pharmacokinetics (e.g., duration), these esters essentially have the same effects as the parent drugs. They are used in androgen replacement therapy (ART), among other indications. Examples of androgen esters include testosterone esters such as testosterone cypionate, testosterone enanthate, testosterone propionate, and testosterone undecanoate and nandrolone esters such as nandrolone decanoate and nandrolone phenylpropionate.

Parenteral durations of androgens/anabolic steroids
Medication	Form	Major brand names	Duration
Testosterone	Aqueous suspension	Andronaq, Sterotate, Virosterone	2–3 days
Testosterone propionate	Oil solution	Androteston, Perandren, Testoviron	3–4 days
Testosterone phenylpropionate	Oil solution	Testolent	8 days
Testosterone isobutyrate	Aqueous suspension	Agovirin Depot, Perandren M	14 days
Mixed testosterone esters^{a}	Oil solution	Triolandren	10–20 days
Mixed testosterone esters^{b}	Oil solution	Testosid Depot	14–20 days
Testosterone enanthate	Oil solution	Delatestryl	14–28 days
Testosterone cypionate	Oil solution	Depovirin	14–28 days
Mixed testosterone esters^{c}	Oil solution	Sustanon 250	28 days
Testosterone undecanoate	Oil solution	Aveed, Nebido	100 days
Testosterone buciclate^{d}	Aqueous suspension	20 Aet-1, CDB-1781^{e}	90–120 days
Nandrolone phenylpropionate	Oil solution	Durabolin	10 days
Nandrolone decanoate	Oil solution	Deca Durabolin	21–28 days
Methandriol	Aqueous suspension	Notandron, Protandren	8 days
Methandriol bisenanthoyl acetate	Oil solution	Notandron Depot	16 days
Metenolone acetate	Oil solution	Primobolan	3 days
Metenolone enanthate	Oil solution	Primobolan Depot	14 days
Note: All are via i.m. injection. Footnotes: ^{a} = TP, TV, and TUe. ^{b} = TP and TKL. ^{c} = TP, TPP, TiCa, and TD. ^{d} = Studied but never marketed. ^{e} = Developmental code names. Sources: See template.

Pharmacokinetics of testosterone esters
Testosterone ester	Form	Route	T_{max}	t_{1/2}	MRT
Testosterone undecanoate	Oil-filled capsules	Oral	?	1.6 hours	3.7 hours
Testosterone propionate	Oil solution	Intramuscular injection	?	0.8 days	1.5 days
Testosterone enanthate	Castor oil solution	Intramuscular injection	10 days	4.5 days	8.5 days
Testosterone undecanoate	Tea seed oil solution	Intramuscular injection	13.0 days	20.9 days	34.9 days
Testosterone undecanoate	Castor oil solution	Intramuscular injection	11.4 days	33.9 days	36.0 days
Testosterone buciclate^{a}	Aqueous suspension	Intramuscular injection	25.8 days	29.5 days	60.0 days
Notes: Testosterone cypionate has similar pharmacokinetics to Testosterone enanthate. Footnotes: ^{a} = Never marketed. Sources: See template.

Structural properties of major testosterone esters
Androgen	Structure	Ester				Relative mol. weight	Relative T content^{b}	logP^{c}
Androgen	Structure	Position(s)	Moiet(ies)	Type	Length^{a}	Relative mol. weight	Relative T content^{b}	logP^{c}
Testosterone		–	–	–	–	1.00	1.00	3.0–3.4
Testosterone propionate		C17β	Propanoic acid	Straight-chain fatty acid	3	1.19	0.84	3.7–4.9
Testosterone isobutyrate		C17β	Isobutyric acid	Branched-chain fatty acid	– (~3)	1.24	0.80	4.9–5.3
Testosterone isocaproate		C17β	Isohexanoic acid	Branched-chain fatty acid	– (~5)	1.34	0.75	4.4–6.3
Testosterone caproate		C17β	Hexanoic acid	Straight-chain fatty acid	6	1.35	0.75	5.8–6.5
Testosterone phenylpropionate		C17β	Phenylpropanoic acid	Aromatic fatty acid	– (~6)	1.46	0.69	5.8–6.5
Testosterone cypionate		C17β	Cyclopentylpropanoic acid	Cyclic carboxylic acid	– (~6)	1.43	0.70	5.1–7.0
Testosterone enanthate		C17β	Heptanoic acid	Straight-chain fatty acid	7	1.39	0.72	3.6–7.0
Testosterone decanoate		C17β	Decanoic acid	Straight-chain fatty acid	10	1.53	0.65	6.3–8.6
Testosterone undecanoate		C17β	Undecanoic acid	Straight-chain fatty acid	11	1.58	0.63	6.7–9.2
Testosterone buciclate^{d}		C17β	Bucyclic acid^{e}	Cyclic carboxylic acid	– (~9)	1.58	0.63	7.9–8.5
Footnotes: ^{a} = Length of ester in carbon atoms for straight-chain fatty acids or approximate length of ester in carbon atoms for aromatic or cyclic fatty acids. ^{b} = Relative testosterone content by weight (i.e., relative androgenic/anabolic potency). ^{c} = Experimental or predicted octanol/water partition coefficient (i.e., lipophilicity/hydrophobicity). Retrieved from PubChem, ChemSpider, and DrugBank. ^{d} = Never marketed. ^{e} = Bucyclic acid = trans-4-Butylcyclohexane-1-carboxylic acid. Sources: See individual articles.

Structural properties of major anabolic steroid esters
Anabolic steroid	Structure	Ester				Relative mol. weight	Relative AAS content^{b}	Duration^{c}
Anabolic steroid	Structure	Position	Moiety	Type	Length^{a}	Relative mol. weight	Relative AAS content^{b}	Duration^{c}
Boldenone undecylenate		C17β	Undecylenic acid	Straight-chain fatty acid	11	1.58	0.63	Long
Drostanolone propionate		C17β	Propanoic acid	Straight-chain fatty acid	3	1.18	0.84	Short
Metenolone acetate		C17β	Ethanoic acid	Straight-chain fatty acid	2	1.14	0.88	Short
Metenolone enanthate		C17β	Heptanoic acid	Straight-chain fatty acid	7	1.37	0.73	Long
Nandrolone decanoate		C17β	Decanoic acid	Straight-chain fatty acid	10	1.56	0.64	Long
Nandrolone phenylpropionate		C17β	Phenylpropanoic acid	Aromatic fatty acid	– (~6–7)	1.48	0.67	Long
Trenbolone acetate		C17β	Ethanoic acid	Straight-chain fatty acid	2	1.16	0.87	Short
Trenbolone enanthate^{d}		C17β	Heptanoic acid	Straight-chain fatty acid	7	1.41	0.71	Long
Footnotes: ^{a} = Length of ester in carbon atoms for straight-chain fatty acids or approximate length of ester in carbon atoms for aromatic fatty acids. ^{b} = Relative androgen/anabolic steroid content by weight (i.e., relative androgenic/anabolic potency). ^{c} = Duration by intramuscular or subcutaneous injection in oil solution. ^{d} = Never marketed. Sources: See individual articles.

== See also ==
- List of androgen esters
- List of androgens/anabolic steroids
- Steroid ester
- Estrogen ester
- Progestogen ester
