= Trenbolone hexahydrobenzylcarbonate =

Chemical compound

Clinical data
- Trade names: Parabolan, Hexabolan
- Other names: Trenbolone cyclohexylmethylcarbonate; Estra-4,9,11-trien-17β-ol-3-one 17β-cyclohexylmethylcarbonate
- Routes of administration: Intramuscular
- Drug class: Androgen; Anabolic steroid; Androgen ester; Progestogen

Legal status
- Legal status: UK: Class C; US: Schedule III

Identifiers
- IUPAC name: Cyclohexylmethyl [(8S,13S,14S,17S)-13-methyl-3-oxo-2,6,7,8,14,15,16,17-octahydro-1H-cyclopenta[a]phenanthren-17-yl] carbonate
- CAS Number: 23454-33-3
- PubChem CID: 20055297
- ChemSpider: 16736552
- UNII: BNJ7Y3JFF2
- CompTox Dashboard (EPA): DTXSID20946113
- ECHA InfoCard: 100.041.503

Chemical and physical data
- Formula: C_{26}H_{34}O_{4}
- Molar mass: 410.554 g·mol^{−1}
- 3D model (JSmol): Interactive image
- SMILES: C[C@]12C=CC3=C4CCC(=O)C=C4CC[C@H]3[C@@H]1CC[C@@H]2OC(=O)OCC5CCCCC5
- InChI: InChI=1S/C26H34O4/c1-26-14-13-21-20-10-8-19(27)15-18(20)7-9-22(21)23(26)11-12-24(26)30-25(28)29-16-17-5-3-2-4-6-17/h13-15,17,22-24H,2-12,16H2,1H3/t22-,23+,24+,26+/m1/s1; Key:GQJSFWYQKNQCIK-APFRJGHOSA-N

Trenbolone hexahydrobenzylcarbonate, or trenbolone cyclohexylmethylcarbonate, sold under the brand names Parabolan and Hexabolan, is a synthetic, injected anabolic–androgenic steroid (AAS) of the nandrolone group and an androgen ester – specifically, the C17β hexahydrobenzylcarbonate (cyclohexylmethylcarbonate) ester of trenbolone – which was marketed in France for medical use in humans but has since been discontinued.

It was marketed from 1971 to 1997 for cachexia, recovery from major surgery, burns and pressure ulcers, and certain forms of osteoporosis. The standard dose was one ampoule (76 mg of trenbolone hexahydrobenzylcarbonate, equivalent to 50 mg base trenbolone) per fifteen days for a month, then one ampoule per month for three months. The drug acts as a long-lasting prodrug of trenbolone when administered via intramuscular injection.

== See also ==
- List of androgen esters § Trenbolone esters
