= Trenbolone =

Anabolic steroid

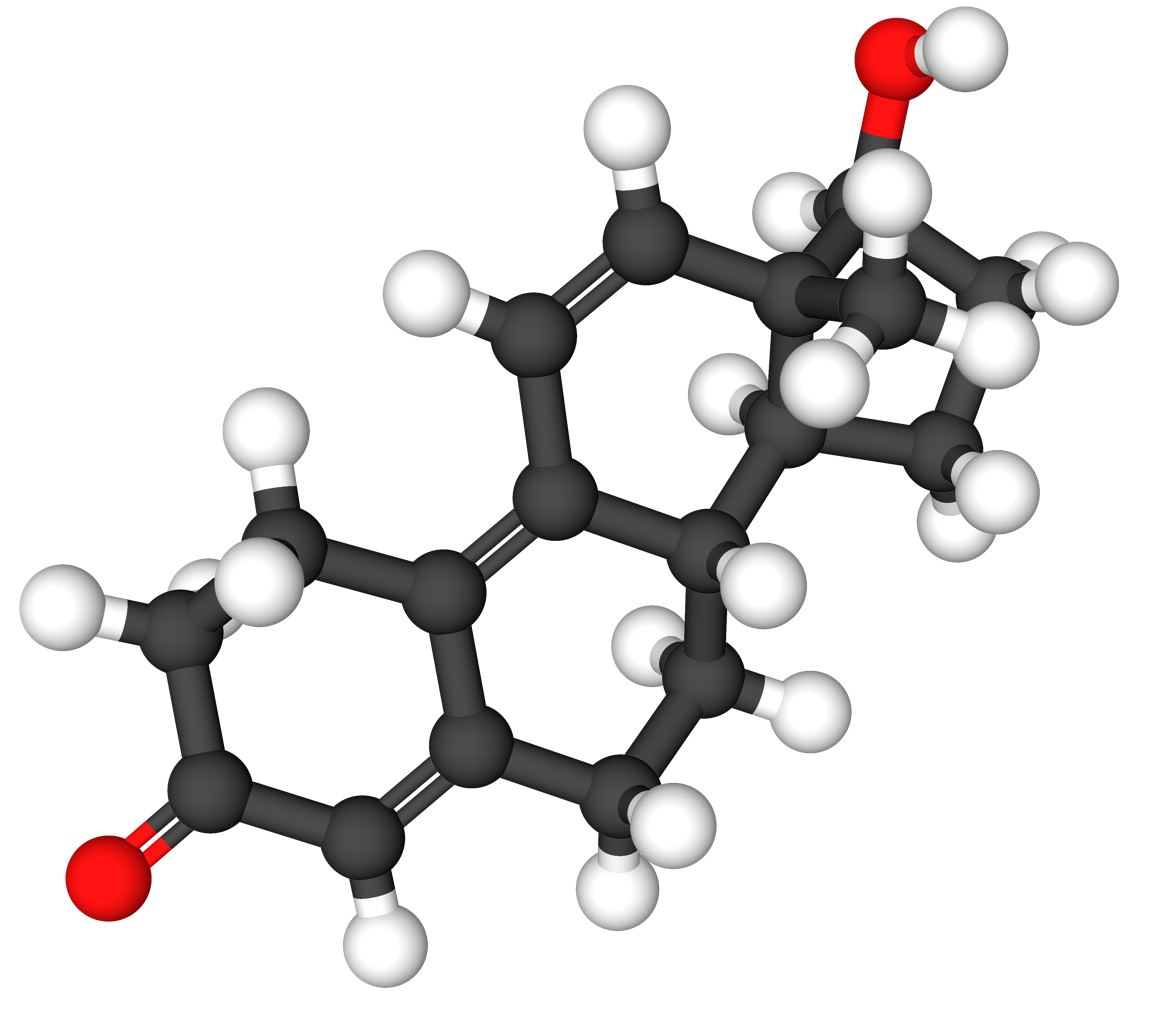

Clinical data
- Other names: Trienolone; Trienbolone; RU-2341; Δ^{9,11}-Nandrolone; 19-Nor-δ^{9,11}-testosterone; Estra-4,9,11-trien-17β-ol-3-one
- AHFS/Drugs.com: International Drug Names
- License data: US DailyMed: Trenbolone
- Pregnancy category: X
- Routes of administration: Intramuscular (as esters)
- Drug class: Androgen; Anabolic steroid; Progestogen
- ATC code: None

Legal status
- Legal status: BR: Class C5 (Anabolic steroids); CA: Schedule IV; US: Schedule III

Pharmacokinetic data
- Bioavailability: IM: 80-100%
- Metabolism: Liver
- Elimination half-life: 6–8 hours
- Excretion: Urine

Identifiers
- IUPAC name: (8S,13S,14S,17S)-17-Hydroxy-13-methyl-2,6,7,8,14,15,16,17-octahydro-1H-cyclopenta[a]phenanthren-3-one
- CAS Number: 10161-33-8
- PubChem CID: 25015
- DrugBank: DB11551
- ChemSpider: 23383
- UNII: P53R4420TR
- KEGG: D08627
- ChEBI: CHEBI:35018
- ChEMBL: ChEMBL3182355
- CompTox Dashboard (EPA): DTXSID0034192
- ECHA InfoCard: 100.127.177

Chemical and physical data
- Formula: C_{18}H_{22}O_{2}
- Molar mass: 270.372 g·mol^{−1}
- 3D model (JSmol): Interactive image
- SMILES: O=C4\C=C2/C(=C1/C=C\[C@@]3([C@@H](O)CC[C@H]3[C@@H]1CC2)C)CC4
- InChI: InChI=1S/C18H22O2/c1-18-9-8-14-13-5-3-12(19)10-11(13)2-4-15(14)16(18)6-7-17(18)20/h8-10,15-17,20H,2-7H2,1H3/t15-,16+,17+,18+/m1/s1; Key:MEHHPFQKXOUFFV-OWSLCNJRSA-N

Trenbolone is an androgen and anabolic steroid (AAS) of the nandrolone group which itself was never marketed for human use. Trenbolone ester prodrugs, including trenbolone acetate (brand names Finajet, Finaplix, others) and trenbolone hexahydrobenzylcarbonate (brand names Parabolan, Hexabolan), are or have been marketed for veterinary and clinical use. Trenbolone acetate is used in veterinary medicine in livestock to increase muscle growth and appetite, while trenbolone hexahydrobenzylcarbonate was formerly used clinically in humans but is now no longer marketed. In addition, although it is not approved for clinical or veterinary use, trenbolone enanthate is sometimes sold on the black market under the name trenabol.

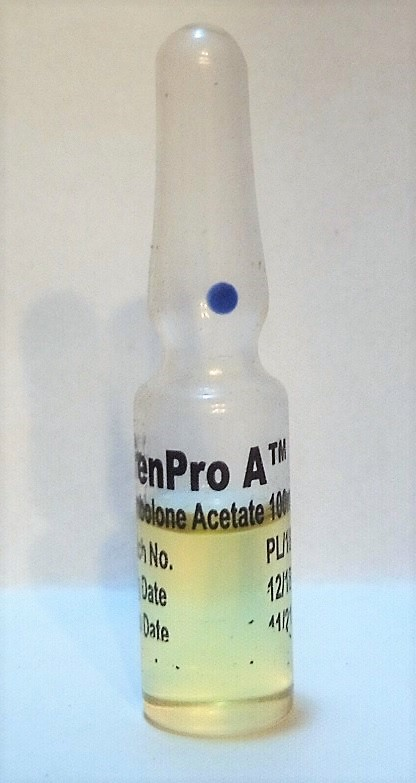
A vial of injectable trenbolone acetate

== Uses ==
=== Veterinary ===
Trenbolone, as trenbolone acetate, improves muscle mass, feed efficiency, and mineral absorption in cattle.

== Side effects ==
Sometimes human users may experience an event called "tren cough" shortly after or during an injection, where the user experiences a violent and extreme coughing fit, which can last for minutes and in some cases even longer.

"Tren cough", despite its name, is not exclusive to trenbolone. It can occur when injecting any oil-steroid solutions, if the solution accidentally is injected intravenously. When the oil-steroid solution gets into the bloodstream, the steroid oil solution travels into the lungs, therefore causing a coughing fit. There are several theories on why this phenomenon happens.

It is possible that the androgenic effect from steroids activates a variety of lipid-like active compounds which are called prostaglandins. Many of these prostaglandins are inflammatory and vasoconstrictive. Prostaglandins are signalled through two varying pathways cyclooxygenase (COX) (Also known as: prostaglandin-endoperoxide synthase) and lipoxygenases (LOX) (also known as: EC 1.13.11.34, EC 1.13.11.33, etc.). The bradykinin peptide is well known to promote a cough reaction associated with ACE inhibitor medications prescribed for hypertension.

== Pharmacology ==
=== Pharmacodynamics ===
Trenbolone has both anabolic and androgenic effects. Once metabolized, trenbolone esters have the effect of increasing ammonium ion uptake by muscles, leading to an increase in the rate of protein synthesis. It may also have the secondary effects of stimulating appetite and decreasing the rate of catabolism, as all anabolic steroids are believed to; however, catabolism likely increases significantly once the steroid is no longer taken. At least one study in rats has shown trenbolone to cause gene expression of the androgen receptor (AR) at least as potent as dihydrotestosterone (DHT). This evidence tends to indicate trenbolone can cause an increase in male secondary sex characteristics without the need to convert to a more potent androgen in the body.

Studies on metabolism are mixed, with some studies showing that it is metabolized by aromatase into estrogenic compounds, or by 5α-reductase into 5α-reduced androgenic compounds.

The potency of trenbolone is not known, although it's often falsely believed to be five times higher than testosterone. This is based on a book by William Llewellyn but has not been definitively proven. Trenbolone was never approved for human use, and therefore limited data on the subject exists. The relevant studies are usually done in rats, which makes the 500/100 potency number inaccurate. Rats respond differently and are less sensitive to androgens. While some literature report a 5 fold higher potency, two other scientific reviews report a 3 fold higher potency. Trenbolone also binds with high affinity to the progesterone receptor, and binds to the glucocorticoid receptor as well.

=== Pharmacokinetics ===
To prolong its elimination half-life, trenbolone is administered as a prodrug as an ester conjugate such as trenbolone acetate, trenbolone enanthate, or trenbolone hexahydrobenzylcarbonate. Plasma lipases then cleave the ester group in the bloodstream leaving free trenbolone.

Trenbolone and 17-epitrenbolone are both excreted in urine as conjugates that can be hydrolyzed with beta-glucuronidase. This implies that trenbolone leaves the body as beta-glucuronides or sulfates.

== Chemistry ==
Trenbolone, also known as 19-nor-δ^{9,11}-testosterone or as estra-4,9,11-trien-17β-ol-3-one, is a synthetic estrane steroid and a derivative of nandrolone (19-nortestosterone). It is specifically nandrolone with two additional double bonds in the steroid nucleus. Trenbolone esters, which have an ester at the C17β position, include trenbolone acetate, trenbolone enanthate, trenbolone hexahydrobenzylcarbonate, and trenbolone undecanoate.

Basic information about different types steroids included base trenbolone inside structure.
Name:	Trenbolone	Trenbolone acetate	Trenbolone enanthate	Trenbolone hexahydrobenzylcarbonate (cyclohexylmethylcarbonate)
Structural				
Formula	C_{18}H_{22}O_{2}	C_{20}H_{24}O_{3}	C_{25}H_{34}O_{3}	C_{26}H_{34}O_{4}
Crystal system		monocrystalic	monocrystalic	monocrystalic
Elimination half-life	48–72 hours	short 1–2 days; 3 days	long 11 days	8 days

== History ==
Trenbolone was first synthesized in 1963.

== Society and culture ==
=== Generic names ===
Trenbolone is the generic name of the drug and its INN and BAN. It has also been referred to as trienolone or trienbolone or tren.

=== Legal status ===
Some bodybuilders and athletes use trenbolone hexahydrobenzylcarbonate and other esters (acetate, enanthate) for their muscle-building and otherwise performance-enhancing effects. Such use is illegal in the United States and several European and Asian countries. The DEA classifies trenbolone and its esters as Schedule III controlled substances under the Controlled Substances Act. Trenbolone is classified as a Schedule 4 drug in Canada and a class C drug with no penalty for personal use or possession in the United Kingdom. Use or possession of steroids without a prescription is a crime in Australia.

=== Doping in sports ===
There are known cases of doping in sports with trenbolone esters by professional athletes.

== Environmental persistence ==
Early studies suggested that the metabolites of trenbolone acetate would degrade through phototransformation. However, a 2013 paper found that the endocrine-disrupting metabolites were able to reform at night, resulting in a diurnal cycling of the compounds. The environmental persistence of the steroid metabolites results in the contamination of water supplies and the disruption of aquatic reproductive processes. Due to its nocturnal reformation, researchers have referred to trenbolone as the "vampire steroid".

== See also ==
- Metribolone
