= Testosterone ketolaurate =

Chemical compound

Clinical data
- Trade names: Androdurin, Testosid-Depot
- Routes of administration: Intramuscular injection

Identifiers
- IUPAC name: (1S,2R,10R,11S,14S,15S)-2,15-dimethyl-5-oxotetracyclo[8.7.0.0^{2,7}.0^{11,15}]heptadec-6-en-14-yl 3-oxododecanoate
- CAS Number: 5874-98-6
- PubChem CID: 68644
- ChemSpider: 61901
- UNII: 1LOH6F419Q
- KEGG: D06085
- ChEMBL: ChEMBL1697795
- CompTox Dashboard (EPA): DTXSID001024182
- ECHA InfoCard: 100.025.036

Chemical and physical data
- Formula: C_{31}H_{48}O_{4}
- Molar mass: 484.721 g·mol^{−1}
- 3D model (JSmol): Interactive image
- SMILES: CCCCCCCCCC(=O)CC(=O)O[C@H]1CC[C@@H]2[C@@]1(CC[C@H]3[C@H]2CCC4=CC(=O)CC[C@]34C)C
- InChI: InChI=1S/C31H48O4/c1-4-5-6-7-8-9-10-11-23(32)21-29(34)35-28-15-14-26-25-13-12-22-20-24(33)16-18-30(22,2)27(25)17-19-31(26,28)3/h20,25-28H,4-19,21H2,1-3H3/t25-,26-,27-,28-,30-,31-/m0/s1; Key:LTGBMQYUNNUCHA-DQUDHZTESA-N

Testosterone ketolaurate (INN, USAN) (brand names Androdurin, Testosid-Depot (with testosterone propionate)), also known as testosterone caprinoylacetate, is an androgen and anabolic steroid medication and a testosterone ester. It was introduced in 1956. It was marketed both as an oil solution and as a crystalline aqueous suspension.

== See also ==
- Estradiol butyrylacetate/testosterone ketolaurate/reserpine
- Testosterone propionate/testosterone ketolaurate
- List of androgen esters § Testosterone esters
