= Trenbolone enanthate =

Chemical compound

Clinical data
- Other names: Trenabol; Trenbolone heptanoate; 19-Nor-δ^{9,11}-testosterone 17β-enanthate; Estra-4,9,11-trien-17β-ol-3-one 17β-enanthate
- Routes of administration: Intramuscular injection
- Drug class: Androgen; Anabolic steroid; Androgen ester; Progestogen

Legal status
- Legal status: UK: Class C; US: Schedule III

Identifiers
- IUPAC name: [(8S,13S,14S,17S)-13-Methyl-3-oxo-2,6,7,8,14,15,16,17-octahydro-1H-cyclopenta[a]phenanthren-17-yl] heptanoate
- CAS Number: 1629618-98-9
- PubChem CID: 20112041
- ChemSpider: 16788271
- UNII: FF02TM6THR
- CompTox Dashboard (EPA): DTXSID001046847

Chemical and physical data
- Formula: C_{25}H_{34}O_{3}
- Molar mass: 382.544 g·mol^{−1}
- 3D model (JSmol): Interactive image
- SMILES: CCCCCCC(=O)O[C@H]1CC[C@@H]2[C@@]1(C=CC3=C4CCC(=O)C=C4CC[C@@H]23)C
- InChI: InChI=1S/C25H34O3/c1-3-4-5-6-7-24(27)28-23-13-12-22-21-10-8-17-16-18(26)9-11-19(17)20(21)14-15-25(22,23)2/h14-16,21-23H,3-13H2,1-2H3/t21-,22+,23+,25+/m1/s1; Key:HGSFRISGULOJBX-FVEXOFTDSA-N

Trenbolone enanthate is a synthetic and injected anabolic–androgenic steroid (AAS) and a derivative of nandrolone which was never marketed. It is the C17β enanthate ester long-acting prodrug of trenbolone. Trenbolone enanthate was never approved for medical or veterinary use but is used in scientific research and has been sold on the black market for use by bodybuilders and athletes under the name Trenabol.

== Side effects ==
As trenbolone enanthate is a rather potent AAS, it has several potential side effects:

=== Psychological ===
Anabolic-androgenic steroid (AAS) users report significant psychological changes. AAS-induced fluctuations in testosterone, affect the brain's structure and function, potentially leading to mood disorders and aggressive behavior. Trenbolone enanthate users have reported significant psychological changes, including increased aggression, mood instability, and impaired social interactions. Prolonged use of AAS may also lead to psychological dependence.

=== Reproductive health ===
Anabolic-androgenic steroids impact male reproductive health. Their misuse can lead to a condition known as anabolic steroid-induced hypogonadism (ASIH), where natural testosterone production is suppressed. The decreased testosterone production leads to decreased sperm production and can cause prolonged infertility even after stopping use. Chronic AAS use increases the risk of infertility due to its impact on hormonal balance, and some effects such as gynecomastia may not be reversible.

=== Androgenic ===
Trenbolone enanthate can include several androgenic side effects such as increased body hair growth, acne, and potential baldness in predisposed individuals.

=== Gynecomastia ===
Gynecomastia is a condition that enlarges the breast tissue in males which is often produced as a side effect from the use of AAS. AAS can disrupt the normal balance of estrogen and testosterone in the body due to the increase in testosterone, which can be aromatized into estrogen. Elevated levels of estrogen in males can be linked to both weight gain and gynecomastia. While trenbolone enanthate is not a xenoestrogen or a substrate for aromatase, trenbolone exhibits high progestogenic activity.

== Primary uses ==
=== Bodybuilding ===
Trenbolone enanthate is renowned for its capacity to promote significant muscle growth and strength gain. Its anabolic effects facilitate increased protein synthesis and hydrogen retention in muscle tissue. Trenbolone enanthate is also notable in the field of strength gain, with many users reporting marked improvements in their lifting capabilities in part due to the AAS' ability to increase red blood cell count and improve oxygenation of muscle tissue along with the increase in testosterone. The compound is also often employed for its fat-burning properties. It enhances the metabolic rate and promotes the conversion of fat into energy, contributing to leaner muscle development during cutting cycles in body building.

=== Enhanced recovery ===
Trenbolone enanthate is a potential treatment for muscle and bone loss without adverse effects commonly associated with testosterone, such as prostate growth or polycythemia. Trenbolone enanthate was hypothesized to offer benefits similar to selective androgen receptor modulators(SARMs) due to its inability to convert into more potent androgens in specific tissues.

=== Veterinary uses ===
In the veterinary field, Trenbolone acetate has a history of use for increasing muscle mass in livestock. Trenbolone enanthate however has never been approved for veterinary use. The application of Trenbolone acetate is aimed at improving the lean muscle yield in animals prior to slaughter, enhancing the quality of meat production.

== History ==
Trenbolone was first synthesized in 1963 by L. Velluz and his co-workers, it was originally developed for veterinary use to improve muscle mass and feed efficiency in cattle; however, trenbolone's potent anabolic and androgenic properties soon caught the attention of bodybuilders and athletes. The drug, however, has never been approved for human use, which has legal implications.

== Legality ==
Trenbolone enanthate has never had regulatory approval for human use from any single health agency. It is commonly considered a controlled substance and use is generally illegal. For example, in the United States, the Drug Enforcement Administration (DEA) considers trenbolone esters Schedule III controlled substances similar to the likes of Australia wherein possession of trenbolone esters is a criminal offence. However, this compound is considered a class C drug with no penalty for personal use or possession in the United Kingdom or Canada. Sporting organizations, including the World Anti Doping Agency (WADA), closely monitor the use of such substances, especially in competitive events like the Olympics.

== See also ==
- List of androgen esters § Trenbolone esters
