= Phenylpropanoic acid =

Names
- Preferred IUPAC name 3-Phenylpropanoic acid
- Other names Phenylpropionic acid, Benzenepropanoic Acid, β-Phenylpropionic Acid, Benzylacetic Acid, Dihydrocinnamic Acid, β-Phenylpropanoic Acid

Identifiers
CAS Number	501-52-0
3D model (JSmol)	Interactive image
ChEBI	CHEBI:28631
ChEMBL	ChEMBL851
ChemSpider	10181339
DrugBank	DB02024
ECHA InfoCard	100.007.204
EC Number	207-924-5
KEGG	C05629
PubChem CID	107
UNII	5Q445IN5CU
CompTox Dashboard (EPA)	DTXSID2047064
- InChI: InChI=1S/C9H10O2/c10-9(11)7-6-8-4-2-1-3-5-8/h1-5H,6-7H2,(H,10,11) Key: XMIIGOLPHOKFCH-UHFFFAOYSA-N
- SMILES: OC(=O)CCc1ccccc1

Properties
Chemical formula	C_{9}H_{10}O_{2}
Molar mass	150.177 g·mol^{-1}
Appearance	White crystalline solid; faint, sweet, somewhat balsamic and coumarin-like odor
Density	1.126 g/cm^{3}
Melting point	47 to 50 °C (117 to 122 °F; 320 to 323 K)
Boiling point	280 °C (536 °F; 553 K)
Solubility in water	5.9 g/L
log P	1.839
Acidity (pK_{a})	4.66 (H_{2}O)

Hazards
Flash point	110 °C (230 °F; 383 K)

Related compounds
Related compounds	Benzoic acid, Phenylacetic acid, Cinnamic acid
- Except where otherwise noted, data are given for materials in their standard state (at 25 °C [77 °F], 100 kPa). Infobox references

Phenylpropanoic acid or hydrocinnamic acid is a carboxylic acid with the formula C_{9}H_{10}O_{2} belonging to the class of phenylpropanoids. It is a white, crystalline solid with a sweet, floral scent at room temperature. Phenylpropanoic acid has a wide variety of uses including cosmetics, food additives, and pharmaceuticals.

== Preparation and reactions ==
Phenylpropanoic acid can be prepared from cinnamic acid by hydrogenation. Originally it was prepared by reduction with sodium amalgam in water and by electrolysis.

A characteristic reaction of phenylpropanoic acid is its cyclization to 1-indanone. When the side chain is homologated by the Arndt–Eistert reaction, subsequent cyclization affords 2-tetralone, derivatives.

== Uses ==
Phenylpropanoic acid is widely used for flavoring, food additives, spices, fragrance, and medicines as it acts as a fixative agent, or a preservative.

=== Food industry ===
Phenylpropanoic acid is used in the food industry to preserve and maintain the original aroma quality of frozen foods. It can also be used to add or restore original color to food. Shelved foods are protected from microorganism by adding phenylpropanoic acid to prevent deterioration to the food by microorganisms as well as acting as an antioxidant to prolong shelf life foods. This compound is used as a sweetener as well to sweeten food and can be found in table top sweeteners. It can also act as an emulsifier, to keep oil and water mixtures from separating. Phenylpropanoic acid is also added to food for technological purposes in a wide variety including manufacturing, processing, preparation, treatment, packaging, transportation or storage, and food additives. It also provides flavorings for ice cream, bakery, and confectionery.

=== Cosmetics ===
This compound is used frequently in cosmetic products such as perfumes, bath gels, detergent powders, liquid detergents, fabric softeners, and soaps as it gives off a floral scent. The acid is commonly used as flavoring for toothpastes and mouthwashes in addition to providing floral scents and possible fruity, minty, spearmint, strawberry, lychee, and herbal flavorings.
