= Testosterone butyrate =

Chemical compound

Clinical data
- Routes of administration: Intramuscular injection

Identifiers
- IUPAC name: [(8R,9S,10R,13S,14S,17S)-10,13-Dimethyl-3-oxo-1,2,6,7,8,9,11,12,14,15,16,17-dodecahydrocyclopenta[a]phenanthren-17-yl] butanoate
- CAS Number: 3410-54-6
- PubChem CID: 102409
- ChemSpider: 92494
- UNII: 9RD3X2793Y
- CompTox Dashboard (EPA): DTXSID40955646
- ECHA InfoCard: 100.020.270

Chemical and physical data
- Formula: C_{23}H_{34}O_{3}
- Molar mass: 358.522 g·mol^{−1}
- 3D model (JSmol): Interactive image
- SMILES: CCCC(=O)O[C@H]1CC[C@@H]2[C@@]1(CC[C@H]3[C@H]2CCC4=CC(=O)CC[C@]34C)C
- InChI: InChI=1S/C23H34O3/c1-4-5-21(25)26-20-9-8-18-17-7-6-15-14-16(24)10-12-22(15,2)19(17)11-13-23(18,20)3/h14,17-20H,4-13H2,1-3H3/t17-,18-,19-,20-,22-,23-/m0/s1; Key:OMPTUWYLCDEFSJ-WAUHAFJUSA-N

Testosterone butyrate, or testosterone butanoate, also known as androst-4-en-17β-ol-3-one 17β-butanoate, is a synthetic, steroidal androgen and an androgen ester – specifically, the C17β butanoate ester of testosterone – which was first synthesized in the 1930s and was never marketed. Its ester side-chain length and duration of effect are intermediate between those of testosterone propionate and testosterone valerate.

Parenteral durations of androgens/anabolic steroids
Medication	Form	Major brand names	Duration
Testosterone	Aqueous suspension	Andronaq, Sterotate, Virosterone	2–3 days
Testosterone propionate	Oil solution	Androteston, Perandren, Testoviron	3–4 days
Testosterone phenylpropionate	Oil solution	Testolent	8 days
Testosterone isobutyrate	Aqueous suspension	Agovirin Depot, Perandren M	14 days
Mixed testosterone esters^{a}	Oil solution	Triolandren	10–20 days
Mixed testosterone esters^{b}	Oil solution	Testosid Depot	14–20 days
Testosterone enanthate	Oil solution	Delatestryl	14–28 days
Testosterone cypionate	Oil solution	Depovirin	14–28 days
Mixed testosterone esters^{c}	Oil solution	Sustanon 250	28 days
Testosterone undecanoate	Oil solution	Aveed, Nebido	100 days
Testosterone buciclate^{d}	Aqueous suspension	20 Aet-1, CDB-1781^{e}	90–120 days
Nandrolone phenylpropionate	Oil solution	Durabolin	10 days
Nandrolone decanoate	Oil solution	Deca Durabolin	21–28 days
Methandriol	Aqueous suspension	Notandron, Protandren	8 days
Methandriol bisenanthoyl acetate	Oil solution	Notandron Depot	16 days
Metenolone acetate	Oil solution	Primobolan	3 days
Metenolone enanthate	Oil solution	Primobolan Depot	14 days
Note: All are via i.m. injection. Footnotes: ^{a} = TP, TV, and TUe. ^{b} = TP and TKL. ^{c} = TP, TPP, TiCa, and TD. ^{d} = Studied but never marketed. ^{e} = Developmental code names. Sources: See template.

== See also ==
- Testosterone acetate
- Testosterone caproate
- Testosterone enanthate
