= C25H38O4 =

The molecular formula C_{25}H_{38}O_{4} (molar mass: 402.57 g/mol) may refer to:

- Androstenediol dipropionate, or 5-androstenediol 3β,17β-dipropionate
- Testosterone dipropionate, or 4-androstenediol 3β,17β-dipropionate
- Testosterone acetate butyrate, or 4-androstenediol 3β-acetate 17β-butanoate
- Oxprenoate, also called oxprenoic acid
- Terpestacin
