= Testosterone diacetate =

Chemical compound

Clinical data
- Other names: Testosterone 3β,17β-diacetate; 4-Androstenediol diacetate; Androst-4-ene-3β,17β-diol 3β,17β-diacetate
- Routes of administration: Intramuscular injection

Identifiers
- IUPAC name: [(3S,8R,9S,10R,13S,14S,17S)-17-Acetyloxy-10,13-dimethyl-2,3,6,7,8,9,11,12,14,15,16,17-dodecahydro-1H-cyclopenta[a]phenanthren-3-yl] acetate
- CAS Number: 4136-03-2
- PubChem CID: 11954158
- ChemSpider: 10128453
- UNII: 8TXA2E96LO
- KEGG: C15324
- ChEBI: CHEBI:79826

Chemical and physical data
- Formula: C_{23}H_{34}O_{4}
- Molar mass: 374.521 g·mol^{−1}
- 3D model (JSmol): Interactive image
- SMILES: CC(=O)O[C@H]1CC[C@@]2([C@H]3CC[C@]4([C@H]([C@@H]3CCC2=C1)CC[C@@H]4OC(=O)C)C)C
- InChI: InChI=1S/C23H34O4/c1-14(24)26-17-9-11-22(3)16(13-17)5-6-18-19-7-8-21(27-15(2)25)23(19,4)12-10-20(18)22/h13,17-21H,5-12H2,1-4H3/t17-,18-,19-,20-,21-,22-,23-/m0/s1; Key:FKDRTPPOFBKQAT-FQJIPJFPSA-N

Testosterone diacetate, or testosterone 3β,17β-diacetate, also known as 4-androstenediol diacetate, as well as androst-4-ene-3β,17β-diol 3β,17β-diacetate, is a synthetic anabolic-androgenic steroid and an androgen ester which was never marketed. It is the 3β,17β-diacetate diester of testosterone (androst-4-en-17β-ol-3-one), or, more accurately, of 4-androstenediol (androst-4-ene-3β,17β-diol).

== See also ==
- Testosterone acetate butyrate
- Testosterone acetate propionate
- Testosterone dipropionate
- Bolandiol dipropionate
- Methandriol bisenanthoyl acetate
- Methandriol diacetate
- Methandriol dipropionate
