= Testosterone dipropionate =

Chemical compound

Clinical data
- Other names: Testosterone 3β,17β-dipropanoate; 4-Androstenediol dipropionate; Androst-4-ene-3β,17β-diol 3β,17β-dipropanoate
- Routes of administration: Intramuscular injection

Identifiers
- CAS Number: 56699-31-1
- PubChem CID: 44135379
- ChemSpider: 23009884
- UNII: TUU5UC8X96
- CompTox Dashboard (EPA): DTXSID901337067

Chemical and physical data
- Formula: C_{25}H_{38}O_{4}
- Molar mass: 402.575 g·mol^{−1}
- 3D model (JSmol): Interactive image
- SMILES: CCC(=O)O[C@H]1CC[C@@]2([C@H]3CC[C@]4([C@H]([C@@H]3CCC2=C1)CC[C@@H]4OC(=O)CC)C)C
- InChI: InChI=1S/C25H38O4/c1-5-22(26)28-17-11-13-24(3)16(15-17)7-8-18-19-9-10-21(29-23(27)6-2)25(19,4)14-12-20(18)24/h15,17-21H,5-14H2,1-4H3/t17-,18-,19-,20-,21-,24-,25-/m0/s1; Key:AWORKLQNESDOMD-YMKPZFJOSA-N

Testosterone dipropionate, or testosterone 3β,17β-dipropanoate, also known as 4-androstenediol dipropionate, as well as androst-4-ene-3β,17β-diol 3β,17β-dipropanoate, is a synthetic anabolic-androgenic steroid and an androgen ester which was never marketed. It is the 3β,17β-dipropionate (dipropanoate) diester of testosterone (androst-4-en-17β-ol-3-one), or, more accurately, of 4-androstenediol (androst-4-ene-3β,17β-diol).

== See also ==
- Testosterone acetate butyrate
- Testosterone acetate propionate
- Testosterone diacetate
- Androstenediol dipropionate
- Bolandiol dipropionate
- Methandriol bisenanthoyl acetate
- Methandriol diacetate
- Methandriol dipropionate
