= C24H36O4 =

The molecular formula C_{24}H_{36}O_{4} (molar mass: 388.54 g/mol) may refer to:

- Bolandiol dipropionate, or norpropandrolate
- Methandriol diacetate, or methylandrostenediol diacetate
- Testosterone acetate propionate
