= Testosterone acetate butyrate =

Chemical compound

Clinical data
- Other names: Testosterone 3β-acetate 17β-butanoate; 4-Androstenediol acetate butyrate; Androst-4-ene-3β,17β-diol 3β-acetate 17β-butanoate
- Routes of administration: Intramuscular injection

Identifiers
- CAS Number: 81340-54-7
- ChemSpider: 58838614

Chemical and physical data
- Formula: C_{25}H_{38}O_{4}
- Molar mass: 402.575 g·mol^{−1}
- 3D model (JSmol): Interactive image
- SMILES: [H][C@@]12CCC(OC(=O)CCC)[C@@]1(C)CC[C@@]1([H])[C@@]2([H])CCC2=C[C@H](CC[C@]12C)OC(C)=O
- InChI: InChI=1S/C25H38O4/c1-5-6-23(27)29-22-10-9-20-19-8-7-17-15-18(28-16(2)26)11-13-24(17,3)21(19)12-14-25(20,22)4/h15,18-22H,5-14H2,1-4H3/t18-,19?,20-,21-,22?,24?,25?/m0/s1; Key:ORLSJEJHBHEYAC-MTGIWVILSA-N

Testosterone acetate butyrate, or testosterone 3β-acetate 17β-butanoate, also known as 4-androstenediol acetate butyrate, as well as androst-4-ene-3β,17β-diol 3β-acetate 17β-butanoate, is a synthetic anabolic-androgenic steroid and an androgen ester which was never marketed. It is the 3β-acetate, 17β-butyrate (butanoate) diester of testosterone (androst-4-en-17β-ol-3-one), or, more accurately, of 4-androstenediol (androst-4-ene-3β,17β-diol).

== See also ==
- Testosterone acetate propionate
- Testosterone diacetate
- Testosterone dipropionate
- Bolandiol dipropionate
- Methandriol bisenanthoyl acetate
- Methandriol diacetate
- Methandriol dipropionate
