= Testosterone acetate propionate =

Chemical compound

Clinical data
- Other names: Testosterone 3β-acetate 17β-propanoate; 4-Androstenediol acetate propionate; Androst-4-ene-3β,17β-diol 3β-acetate 17β-propanoate
- Routes of administration: Intramuscular injection

Identifiers
- CAS Number: 56699-31-1
- ChemSpider: 58838616
- UNII: TUU5UC8X96

Chemical and physical data
- Formula: C_{24}H_{36}O_{4}
- Molar mass: 388.548 g·mol^{−1}
- 3D model (JSmol): Interactive image
- SMILES: [H][C@@]12CCC(OC(=O)CC)[C@@]1(C)CC[C@@]1([H])[C@@]2([H])CCC2=C[C@H](CC[C@]12C)OC(C)=O
- InChI: InChI=1S/C24H36O4/c1-5-22(26)28-21-9-8-19-18-7-6-16-14-17(27-15(2)25)10-12-23(16,3)20(18)11-13-24(19,21)4/h14,17-21H,5-13H2,1-4H3/t17-,18?,19-,20-,21?,23?,24?/m0/s1; Key:JDSHKUCLJUXHAY-FOKOGLMQSA-N

Testosterone acetate propionate, or testosterone 3β-acetate 17β-propanoate, also known as 4-androstenediol acetate propionate, as well as androst-4-ene-3β,17β-diol 3β-acetate 17β-propanoate, is a synthetic anabolic-androgenic steroid and an androgen ester which was never marketed. It is the 3β-acetate, 17β-propionate (propanoate) diester of testosterone (androst-4-en-17β-ol-3-one), or, more accurately, of 4-androstenediol (androst-4-ene-3β,17β-diol).

== See also ==
- Testosterone acetate butyrate
- Testosterone diacetate
- Testosterone dipropionate
- Bolandiol dipropionate
- Methandriol bisenanthoyl acetate
- Methandriol diacetate
- Methandriol dipropionate
