= Fusaproliferin =

Mycotoxin produced by the genus Fusarium

- Fusaproliferin

Names
- IUPAC name [(2S)-2-[(1S,3E,7E,11S,12E,15R)-11,17-dihydroxy-1,4,8,12-tetramethyl-18-oxo-16-bicyclo[13.3.0]octadeca-3,7,12,16-tetraenyl]propyl] acetate

Identifiers
| CAS Number | 152469-17-5 |
| 3D model (JSmol) | Interactive image |
| ChEMBL | ChEMBL486177 |
| ChemSpider | 5005794 |
| KEGG | C20591 |
| PubChem CID | 6506535 |
- InChI: InChI=1S/C27H40O5/c1-17-8-7-9-18(2)14-15-27(6)22(12-11-19(3)23(29)13-10-17)24(25(30)26(27)31)20(4)16-32-21(5)28/h8,11,14,20,22-23,29-30H,7,9-10,12-13,15-16H2,1-6H3/b17-8+,18-14+,19-11+/t20-,22-,23+,27+/m1/s1 Key: VRGWBRLULZUWAJ-UEWDWXLZSA-N
- SMILES: C/C/1=C\CC/C(=C/C[C@]2([C@H](C/C=C(/[C@H](CC1)O)\C)C(=C(C2=O)O)[C@H](C)COC(=O)C)C)/C

Properties
| Chemical formula | C_{27}H_{40}O_{5} |
| Molar mass | 444.6 g/mol |
- Except where otherwise noted, data are given for materials in their standard state (at 25 °C [77 °F], 100 kPa). verify (what is ?) Infobox references

Fusaproliferin is a mycotoxin that is naturally produced by the fungi genus Fusarium to protect itself against competing microorganisms. It was first isolated from the Fusarium proliferatum species but can be found in at least 15 species within this genus. It was initially named proliferin, but the name was later changed to fusaproliferin because 'proliferin' was already in use. Fusarium fungi are found in soil and can grow on host plants such as grains, fruits, nuts, and spices. Consuming these products poses a significant health risk to living organisms. Health effects caused by mycotoxins include severe illness, cancer and immune deficiency. Most mycotoxins are chemically stable and can withstand food processing.

The compound was first identified in 1976 in maize, its structure was deduced in 1993 and its absolute conformation determined in 1996.

== Biological effects ==
Many mycotoxins are known for their ROS generating properties; fusaproliferin might exhibit similar effects. While the exact molecular mechanisms remain unclear, observations have given insight into the potential targets of fusaproliferin. Recorded disruptive interactions of fusaproliferins includes anti-inflammatory effects and the disruption of the innate immune response receptor TLR4. When observing fusaproliferin, and its analogues, a high binding affinity with TLR4 was detected, influencing inflammatory immune responses. Furthermore, it was observed that fusaproliferin inhibits IKK in the NF-κB signalling pathway, reducing phosphorylation and nuclear translocation; disallowing inflammation-induced gene expression. Another observation involves the MAPK-pathway. Fusaproliferin caused a reduction in phosphorylation of MAPKs, including p38, JNK and ERK. These proteins regulate inflammatory signaling, further supporting the hypothesis of fusaproliferin's anti-inflammatory properties. Moreover, noncovalent DNA interactions of fusaproliferin may play a role in gene regulation and teratogenic effects.

== Toxicology data ==
A toxicity bioassay of fusaproliferin in Brine Shrimp (A. salina) larvae showed an LD_{50}-value of 53.4 μM. Acetylated fusaproliferin displayed a higher toxicity, with an LD_{50}-value of 17.5 μM. Acetylation reduces its polarity and could enhance its ability to cross cell membranes, increasing its toxicity. In a lepidopteran SF-9 cell line, CC_{50}-values of 100 μM and 70 μM were found after 24 and 48 hours, respectively. Furthermore, the CC_{50}-value in human B-Lymphocyte IARC-171 cells was 60–65 μM after 24 hours and 55 μM after 48 hours. 30 μM of fusaproliferin at passing resulted in impaired B-Lymphocytes cell growth.

In chicken embryos, 1-5 μM of fusaproliferin caused malformations. Teratogenic manifestations included anomalous extremities development, macrocephaly, abnormal head-to-body size ratio and absence of the head.

== Therapeutic applications ==
Potential therapeutic applications for fusaproliferin have not been fully determined, however, research involving its properties suggests that it can be used as treatment against inflammation-associated diseases, as it suppresses signalling pathways related to inflammation. It can also potentially be used as an anti-cancer drug as it showed rapid cytotoxicity against pancreatic and breast cancer cells by inducing apoptosis and necrosis. However, the molecular mechanism behind this observation remains unclear. Further research is required to confirm these potential therapeutic applications.

== Molecular structure ==
Fusaproliferin is a bicyclic sesterterpene with ester, ketone and hydroxyl functional groups. A combination of the fused-ring system and rigid, non-polar framework tends to enhance lipophilicity. In addition, with the multiple (hydrophobic) methyl groups, the compound will dissolve better in lipophilic environments.

== Metabolism ==
=== Anabolism ===
Fusaproliferin is biosynthesized through the mevalonate pathway. Two acetyl-CoA molecules combine to form acetoacetyl-CoA; then a third acetyl-CoA joins in, resulting in mevalonic acid. Mevalonic acid undergoes phosphorylation and enzymatic transformations, creating isopentenyl pyrophosphate (IPP). Two IPP molecules combine to form geranyl pyrophosphate (GPP); adding a third IPP molecule produces farnesyl pyrophosphate (FPP). Geranylgeranyl pyrophosphate (GGPP) forms through the reaction of FPP and IPP. Cyclization of GGPP can form fusaproliferin or other compounds, depending on the enzymatic reactions involved. The biosynthesis of fusaproliferin involves a gene cluster and specific enzymes. FUP1 is responsible for cyclization, FUP2 and a second P450 enzyme introduce hydroxyl groups. FUP4 oxidizes the intermediate, and FUP5 performs an acetylation.

=== Catabolism ===
Toxicity studies on A. salina showed that the deacetylation of fusaproliferin resulted in loss of toxicity. The increase in polarity of this metabolite could result in an impaired ability to penetrate cell membranes. Similar deacetylation was seen in vitro using rabbit hepatic enzymes, suggesting that detoxification could also occur in mammals.

== Total synthesis ==
Fusaproliferin is synthesized using terpestacin, a biological precursor of fusaproliferin. This is achieved by bisacetylation of terpestacin followed by selective (-enol) acetate cleavage.

== See also ==
- Aflatoxin
- Ochratoxin
- Citrinin
