= Bolandiol dipropionate =

Chemical compound

Clinical data
- Trade names: Anabiol, Storinal
- Other names: SC-7525

Identifiers
- IUPAC name: [(3S,8R,9S,10R,13S,14S,17S)-13-Methyl-17-propanoyloxy-1,2,3,6,7,8,9,10,11,12,14,15,16,17-tetradecahydrocyclopenta[a]phenanthren-3-yl] propanoate
- CAS Number: 1986-53-4
- PubChem CID: 443979
- ChemSpider: 392020
- UNII: 595CNE7RHB
- ChEBI: CHEBI:31297
- CompTox Dashboard (EPA): DTXSID0057677

Chemical and physical data
- Formula: C_{24}H_{36}O_{4}
- Molar mass: 388.548 g·mol^{−1}
- 3D model (JSmol): Interactive image
- SMILES: CCC(=O)O[C@H]1CC[C@@H]2[C@H]3CC[C@]4([C@H]([C@@H]3CCC2=C1)CC[C@@H]4OC(=O)CC)C
- InChI: InChI=1S/C24H36O4/c1-4-22(25)27-16-7-9-17-15(14-16)6-8-19-18(17)12-13-24(3)20(19)10-11-21(24)28-23(26)5-2/h14,16-21H,4-13H2,1-3H3/t16-,17-,18+,19+,20-,21-,24-/m0/s1; Key:JFAXVZXNIGIDDA-KDWXAGHCSA-N

Bolandiol dipropionate (USAN; brand names Anabiol, Storinal; former development code SC-7525; also known as bolandiol propionate (JAN), norpropandrolate, 19-nor-4-androstenediol dipropionate, or estr-4-ene-3β,17β-diol 3,17-dipropionate) is a synthetic anabolic-androgenic steroid (AAS) and derivative of 19-nortestosterone (nandrolone). It is an androgen ester – specifically, the 3,17-dipropionate ester of bolandiol (19-nor-4-androstenediol).

== See also ==
- Androstenediol dipropionate
- Testosterone acetate butyrate
- Testosterone acetate propionate
- Testosterone diacetate
- Testosterone dipropionate
- Methandriol bisenanthoyl acetate
- Methandriol diacetate
- Methandriol dipropionate
