= Methandriol propionate =

Chemical compound

Clinical data
- Trade names: Metilbisexovis
- Other names: Methylandrostenediol propionate; Methylandrostenediol 3β-propionate; 17α-Methylandrost-5-ene-3β,17β-diol 3β-propionate
- Routes of administration: Intramuscular injection

Identifiers
- IUPAC name: [(3S,8R,9S,10R,13S,14S,17S)-17-Hydroxy-10,13,17-trimethyl-1,2,3,4,7,8,9,11,12,14,15,16-dodecahydrocyclopenta[a]phenanthren-3-yl] propanoate
- CAS Number: 60883-73-0
- PubChem CID: 3085209
- ChemSpider: 2342158
- UNII: G2BS5QC8VV
- CompTox Dashboard (EPA): DTXSID90976361

Chemical and physical data
- Formula: C_{23}H_{36}O_{3}
- Molar mass: 360.538 g·mol^{−1}
- 3D model (JSmol): Interactive image
- SMILES: CCC(=O)O[C@H]1CC[C@@]2([C@H]3CC[C@]4([C@H]([C@@H]3CC=C2C1)CC[C@]4(C)O)C)C
- InChI: InChI=1S/C23H36O3/c1-5-20(24)26-16-8-11-21(2)15(14-16)6-7-17-18(21)9-12-22(3)19(17)10-13-23(22,4)25/h6,16-19,25H,5,7-14H2,1-4H3/t16-,17+,18-,19-,21-,22-,23-/m0/s1; Key:YAZVIHSCBXWIRW-ZGIWMXSJSA-N

Methandriol propionate (brand name Metilbisexovis), or methylandrostenediol propionate, also known as 17α-methylandrost-5-ene-3β,17β-diol 3β-propionate, is a synthetic, injected anabolic-androgenic steroid (AAS) and a 17α-alkylated derivative of 5-androstenediol that is or was marketed by Vister in Italy. It is an androgen ester – specifically, the C3,17β propionate ester of methandriol (17α-methyl-5-androstenediol) – and acts as a prodrug of methandriol in the body. Methandriol propionate is administered by intramuscular injection and, relative to methandriol, has an extended duration via this route due to a depot effect afforded by its ester.

== See also ==
- Methandriol bisenanthoyl acetate
- Methandriol diacetate
- Methandriol dipropionate
