= Progesterone monooxygenase =

Identifiers
- EC no.: 1.14.99.4
- CAS no.: 37256-85-2

Databases
- IntEnz: IntEnz view
- BRENDA: BRENDA entry
- ExPASy: NiceZyme view
- KEGG: KEGG entry
- MetaCyc: metabolic pathway
- PRIAM: profile
- PDB structures: RCSB PDB PDBe PDBsum
- Gene Ontology: AmiGO / QuickGO
Search
- PMC: articles
- PubMed: articles
- NCBI: proteins

Progesterone monooxygenase (EC 1.14.99.4) is an enzyme that catalyzes a chemical reaction that converts the steroid hormone, progesterone, to testosterone acetate. This is part of the mechanism that microorganisms such as Cylindrocarpon radicicola use to break down progesterone

progesterone
+ electron
acceptor
O_{2}
H_{2}O
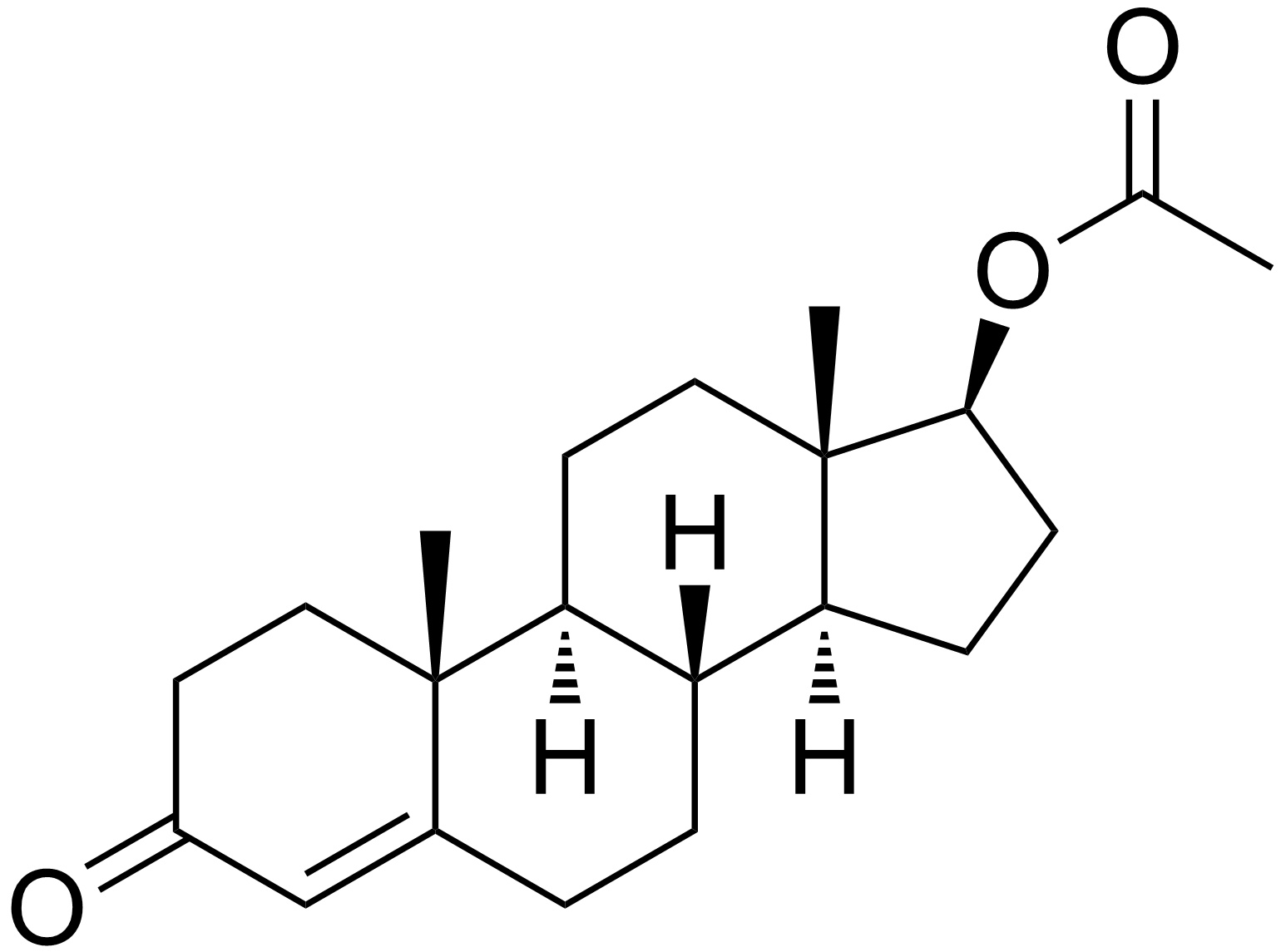
testosterone acetate
+ reduced
acceptor

This enzyme is an oxidoreductase, that uses molecular oxygen together with an unknown electron acceptor. The systematic name of this enzyme class is progesterone,hydrogen-donor:oxygen oxidoreductase (hydroxylating). This enzyme is also called progesterone hydroxylase.
