= Testosterone propionate/testosterone valerate/testosterone undecylenate =

Combination drug

TP/TV/TUe
Combination of
- Testosterone propionate: Androgen; Anabolic steroid
- Testosterone valerate: Androgen; Anabolic steroid
- Testosterone undecylenate: Androgen; Anabolic steroid

Clinical data
- Trade names: Triolandren
- Other names: TP/TV/TUe
- Routes of administration: Intramuscular injection

Testosterone propionate/testosterone valerate/testosterone undecylenate (TP/TV/TUe), sold under the brand name Triolandren, is an injectable combination medication of testosterone propionate (TP), testosterone valerate (TV), and testosterone undecylenate (TUe), which are all androgens/anabolic steroids. It contains 20 mg/mL TP, 80 mg/mL TV, and 150 mg/mL TUe (for a total of 250 mg testosterone ester and 173.8 mg free testosterone) in oil solution and is administered by intramuscular injection at regular intervals. The medication has been reported to have a duration of action of about 10 to 20 days. Ciba Pharmaceutical Products first filed patent applications for the TP/TV/TUe composition in Switzerland in 1954 and subsequently in the United States in 1955.

Parenteral durations of androgens/anabolic steroids
Medication	Form	Major brand names	Duration
Testosterone	Aqueous suspension	Andronaq, Sterotate, Virosterone	2–3 days
Testosterone propionate	Oil solution	Androteston, Perandren, Testoviron	3–4 days
Testosterone phenylpropionate	Oil solution	Testolent	8 days
Testosterone isobutyrate	Aqueous suspension	Agovirin Depot, Perandren M	14 days
Mixed testosterone esters^{a}	Oil solution	Triolandren	10–20 days
Mixed testosterone esters^{b}	Oil solution	Testosid Depot	14–20 days
Testosterone enanthate	Oil solution	Delatestryl	14–28 days
Testosterone cypionate	Oil solution	Depovirin	14–28 days
Mixed testosterone esters^{c}	Oil solution	Sustanon 250	28 days
Testosterone undecanoate	Oil solution	Aveed, Nebido	100 days
Testosterone buciclate^{d}	Aqueous suspension	20 Aet-1, CDB-1781^{e}	90–120 days
Nandrolone phenylpropionate	Oil solution	Durabolin	10 days
Nandrolone decanoate	Oil solution	Deca Durabolin	21–28 days
Methandriol	Aqueous suspension	Notandron, Protandren	8 days
Methandriol bisenanthoyl acetate	Oil solution	Notandron Depot	16 days
Metenolone acetate	Oil solution	Primobolan	3 days
Metenolone enanthate	Oil solution	Primobolan Depot	14 days
Note: All are via i.m. injection. Footnotes: ^{a} = TP, TV, and TUe. ^{b} = TP and TKL. ^{c} = TP, TPP, TiCa, and TD. ^{d} = Studied but never marketed. ^{e} = Developmental code names. Sources: See template.

== See also ==
- Testosterone propionate/testosterone enanthate/testosterone undecylenate
- List of combined sex-hormonal preparations § Androgens
