= C13H25NO2 =

The molecular formula C_{13}H_{25}NO_{2} (molar mass: 227.34 g/mol, exact mass: 227.1885 u) may refer to:

- Cyprodenate
- 4-Nonanoylmorpholine (MPA or MPK)
