= Testosterone acetate/testosterone undecanoate/testosterone valerate =

Anabolic Steroid

Combination of
- Testosterone acetate: Androgen
- Testosterone undecanoate: Androgen
- Testosterone valerate: Androgen

Clinical data
- Trade names: Deposterona
- Other names: TA/TU/TV
- Routes of administration: Intramuscular injection

Testosterone acetate/testosterone undecanoate/testosterone valerate (TA/TU/TV), sold under the brand name Deposterona, is an oil-based mixture of testosterone esters for depot intramuscular injection that is marketed in Mexico and is used in veterinary medicine.

== Composition ==
Its constituents include:

- Testosterone acetate (12 mg/mL)
- Testosterone undecanoate (12 mg/mL)
- Testosterone valerate (36 mg/mL)

Deposterona is described as essentially a low-dosed but longer-lasting alternative to Sustanon.

It is the only formulation of testosterone on the market that contains testosterone valerate.

== See also ==
- Testosterone glucuronide
