= Oxprenoate potassium =

Chemical compound

Clinical data
- Other names: RU-28318; 17α-Hydroxy-3-oxo-7α-propylpregn-4-ene-21-carboxylic acid monopotassium salt
- Drug class: Antimineralocorticoid

Identifiers
- IUPAC name: potassium 3-[(7R,8R,9S,10R,13S,14S,17R)-17-Hydroxy-10,13-dimethyl-3-oxo-7-propyl-2,6,7,8,9,11,12,14,15,16-decahydro-1H-cyclopenta[a]phenanthren-17-yl]propanoate
- CAS Number: 76676-34-1
- PubChem CID: 23677972
- ChemSpider: 64295
- UNII: 167NDD8MTE
- CompTox Dashboard (EPA): DTXSID401337179

Chemical and physical data
- Formula: C_{25}H_{37}KO_{4}
- Molar mass: 440.665 g·mol^{−1}
- 3D model (JSmol): Interactive image
- SMILES: CCC[C@@H]1CC2=CC(=O)CC[C@@]2([C@@H]3[C@@H]1[C@@H]4CC[C@]([C@]4(CC3)C)(CCC(=O)[O-])O)C.[K+]
- InChI: InChI=1S/C25H38O4.K/c1-4-5-16-14-17-15-18(26)6-10-23(17,2)19-7-11-24(3)20(22(16)19)8-12-25(24,29)13-9-21(27)28;/h15-16,19-20,22,29H,4-14H2,1-3H3,(H,27,28);/q;+1/p-1/t16-,19+,20+,22-,23+,24+,25-;/m1./s1; Key:HXJITUGMCJCKCE-UYOQDFFISA-M

Oxprenoate potassium (developmental code name RU-28318) is a synthetic steroidal antimineralocorticoid which was never marketed. The affinities of oxprenoate potassium for the steroid hormone receptors have been reported.

== See also ==
- Oxprenoate
