= Pepper spray =

Inflammatory agent

- Heat: Exceptionally hot
- Scoville scale: 1,250,000 (Note: "Most" law enforcement grade pepper spray is measured anywhere from 500,000 to 2,000,000 SHU, which gives a median number of 1,250,000. While there are sprays that far exceed this amount, the actual strength of the spray depends on the dilution) SHU

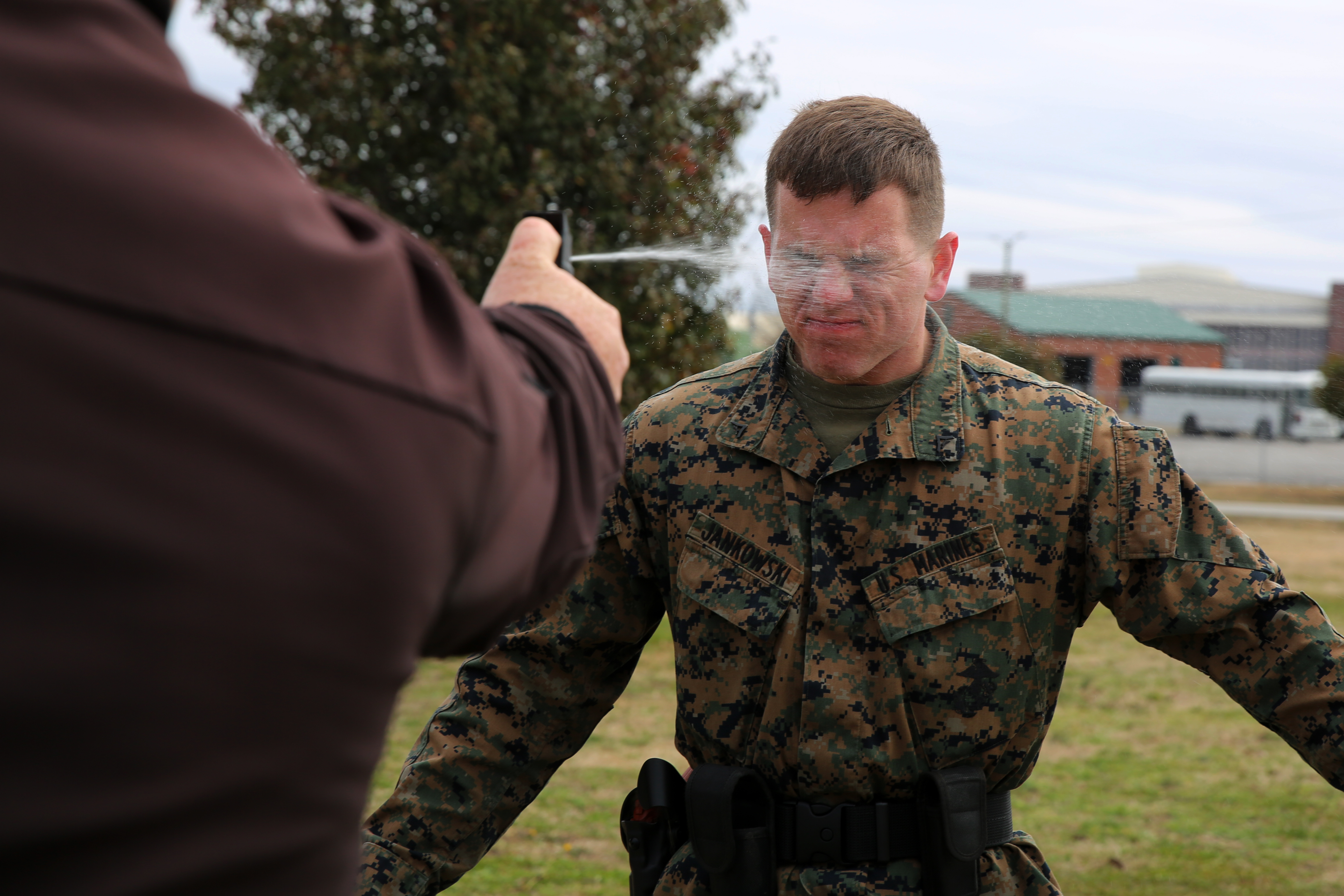
A U.S. Marine being subjected to pepper spray

Pepper spray, oleoresin capsicum spray, OC spray, capsaicin spray, mace, or capsicum spray is a lachrymator (tear gas) product containing as its active ingredient the chemical compound capsaicin, which irritates the eyes with burning and pain sensations and so causes them to close, bringing temporary blindness. This blindness allows officers to more easily restrain subjects and permits people in danger to use pepper spray in self-defense for an opportunity to escape. It also causes temporary discomfort and burning of the lungs which causes shortness of breath. Pepper spray is used as a non-lethal weapon in policing, riot control, crowd control, and self-defense, including defense against violent or threatening animals.

== Components ==
The active ingredient in pepper spray is capsaicin, which is derived from the fruit of plants in the genus Capsicum, including chilis in the form of oleoresin capsicum (OC). Extraction of OC from peppers requires capsicum to be finely ground, from which capsaicin is then extracted using an organic solvent such as ethanol. The solvent is then evaporated, and the remaining waxlike resin is the oleoresin capsaicin.

An emulsifier such as propylene glycol is used to suspend OC in water, and the suspension is then pressurized to make an aerosol pepper spray. Other sprays may use an alcohol (such as isopropyl alcohol) base for a more penetrating product, but a risk of fire is present if they are used in combination with a taser.

The strength of pepper sprays can vary:

- The US federal government uses CRC (capsaicin and related capsaicinoids) content for regulation. CRC is the pain-producing component of the OC that produces the burning sensation. Personal pepper sprays can range from a low of 0.18% to a high of 3%. Most law enforcement pepper sprays use between 1.3% and 2%. The federal government of the United States has determined that bear attack deterrent sprays must contain at least 1.0% and not more than 2% CRC. Because the six different types of capsaicinoids under the CRC heading has different levels of potency (up to 2× on the SHU scale), the measurement does not fully represent the strength. Manufacturers do not state which particular type of capsaicinoids are used.
- Using the OC concentration is unreliable because the concentration of CRC (and potency of these compounds) can vary. Some manufacturers may show a very high percentage of OC, but the resin itself may not be spicy enough. Higher OC content only reliably implies a higher oil content, which may be undesirable as the hydrophobic oil is less able to soak and penetrate skin. Solutions of more than 5% OC may not spray properly.
- Scoville heat units (SHU) is a common indication of pepper spiciness. It does take into account the different potency of CRC compounds, but it cannot be reliably used in pepper spray because it measures the strength of the dry product, i.e. the OC resin and not what comes in the aerosol spray. As the resin is always diluted to make it sprayable, the SHU rating is not useful on its own.

== Counterparts ==
There are several counterparts of pepper spray developed and legal to possess in some countries.

- In the United Kingdom, desmethyldihydrocapsaicin (known also as PAVA spray) is used by police officers. As a Section 5 weapon, it is not generally permitted to the public.
- Pelargonic acid morpholide (MPK) is widely used as a self-defense chemical agent spray in Russia, though its effectiveness compared to natural pepper spray is unclear.
- In China, Ministry of Public Security police units and security guards use tear gas ejectors with OC, CS or CN gases. These are defined as a "restricted" weapon that only police officers, as well as approved security, may use.

== Types ==
- Aerosol compound
  - Cone pattern dispersion: A wide pattern that spreads broadly. It can be blown back by wind and, if used inside a building, will eventually make the room temporarily uninhabitable.
  - Fog pattern dispersion (fogger)
  - Stream pattern dispersion
  - Grenade
- Gel compound: Greater accuracy and a reduced risk of blowback and area cross-contamination, as the carrying gel does not disperse over a large area. The gel compound also adheres to the target, making it more difficult to remove.
- Foam compound

== Effects ==
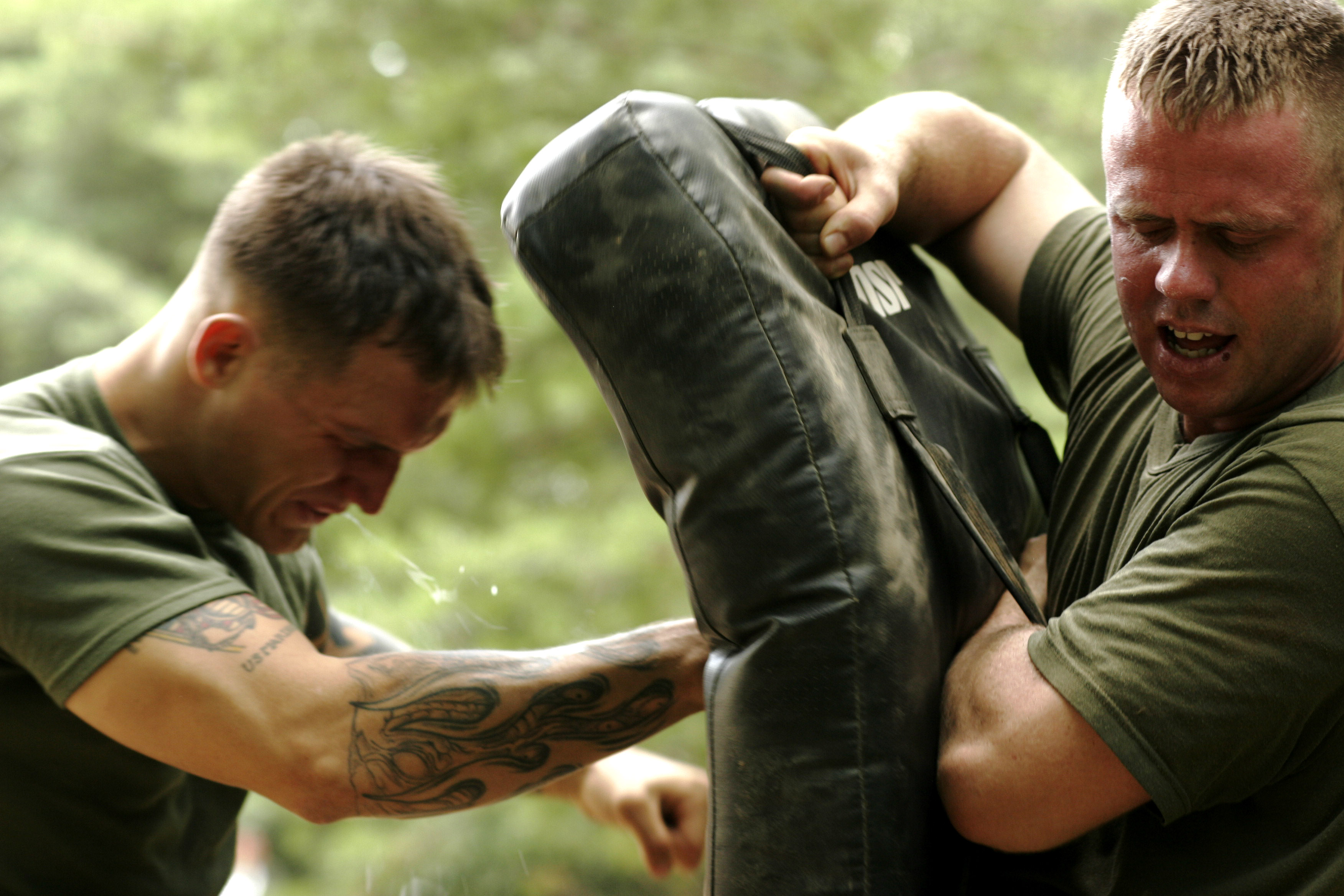
US Marines training after being exposed to pepper spray

Pepper spray is an inflammatory agent. It inflames the mucous membranes in the eyes, nose, throat and lungs.

It causes immediate closing of the eyes, difficulty breathing, runny nose, and coughing. The duration of its effects depends on the strength of the spray; the average full effect lasts from 20 to 90 minutes, but eye irritation and redness can last for up to 24 hours.

The Journal of Investigative Ophthalmology and Visual Science published a study that concluded that single exposure of the eye to OC is harmless, but repeated exposure can result in long-lasting changes in corneal sensitivity. They found no lasting decrease in visual acuity.

The European Parliament Scientific and Technological Options Assessment (STOA) published in 1998 "An Appraisal of Technologies of Political Control" The STOA appraisal states:

Past experience has shown that to rely on manufacturers unsubstantiated claims about the absence of hazards is unwise. In the US, companies making crowd control weapons, (e.g. pepper-gas manufacturer Zarc International), have put their technical data in the public domain without loss of profitability... Research on chemical irritants should be published in open scientific journals before authorization for any usage is permitted and that the safety criteria for such chemicals should be treated as if they were drugs rather than riot control agents

For those taking drugs, or those subjected to restraining techniques that restrict the breathing passages, there is a risk of death. In 1995, the Los Angeles Times reported at least 61 deaths associated with police use of pepper spray since 1990 in the USA. The American Civil Liberties Union (ACLU) documented 27 people in police custody who died after exposure to pepper spray in California since 1993.

The US Army performed studies in 1993 at Aberdeen Proving Ground, and a UNC study in 2000 stated that the compound in peppers, capsaicin, is mildly mutagenic, and 10% of mice exposed to it developed cancer. Where the study also found many beneficial effects of capsaicin, the Occupational Safety and Health Administration released statements declaring exposure of employees to OC is an unnecessary health risk. As of 1999, it was in use by more than 2,000 public safety agencies.

The head of the FBI's Less-Than-Lethal Weapons Program at the time of the 1991 study, Special Agent Thomas W. W. Ward, was fired by the FBI and was sentenced to two months in prison for receiving payments from a pepper-gas manufacturer while conducting and authoring the FBI study that eventually approved pepper spray for FBI use. Prosecutors said that from December 1989 through 1990, Ward received about $5,000 a month for a total of $57,500, from Lackey Police Products, a Fort Lauderdale, Florida-based company that was a major producer and supplier of pepper spray. The payments were paid through a Florida company owned by Ward's wife.

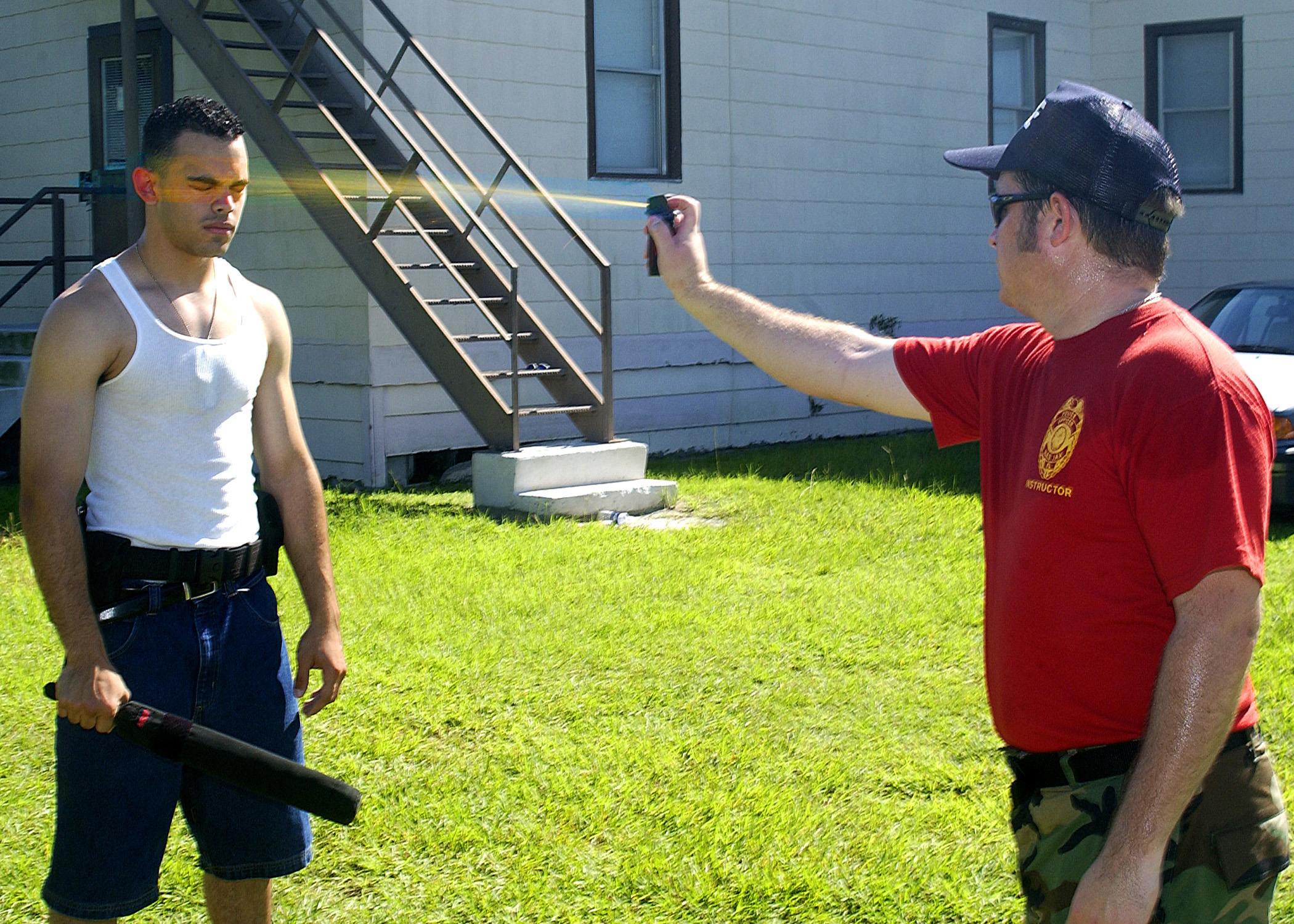
Pepper spray demonstration

Direct close-range spray can cause more serious eye irritation by attacking the cornea with a concentrated stream of liquid (the so-called "hydraulic needle" effect). Some brands have addressed this problem by means of an elliptically cone-shaped spray pattern.

Pepper spray has been associated with positional asphyxiation of individuals in police custody. There is much debate over the actual cause of death in these cases. There have been few controlled clinical studies of the human health effects of pepper spray marketed for police use, and those studies are contradictory. Some studies have found no harmful effects beyond the effects described above. Due to these studies and deaths, many law enforcement agencies have moved to include policies and training to prevent positional deaths.

=== Acute response ===
For individuals not previously exposed to OC effects, the general feelings after being sprayed can be best likened to being "set alight". The initial reaction, should the spray be directed at the face, is the involuntary closing of the eyes, an instant sensation of the restriction of the airways and the general feeling of sudden and intense searing pain about the face, nose, and throat. This is due to irritation of mucous membranes. Many people experience fear and are disoriented due to sudden restriction of vision even though it is temporary. There is associated shortness of breath, although studies performed with asthmatics have not produced any asthma attacks in those individuals, and monitoring is still needed for the individuals after exposure. Police are trained to repeatedly instruct targets to breathe normally if they complain of difficulty, as the shock of the exposure can generate considerable panic as opposed to actual physical symptoms.

== Treatment ==
Capsaicin is not soluble in water, and even large volumes of water will not wash it off, only dilute it. In general, victims are encouraged to blink vigorously in order to encourage tears, which will help flush the irritant from the eyes.

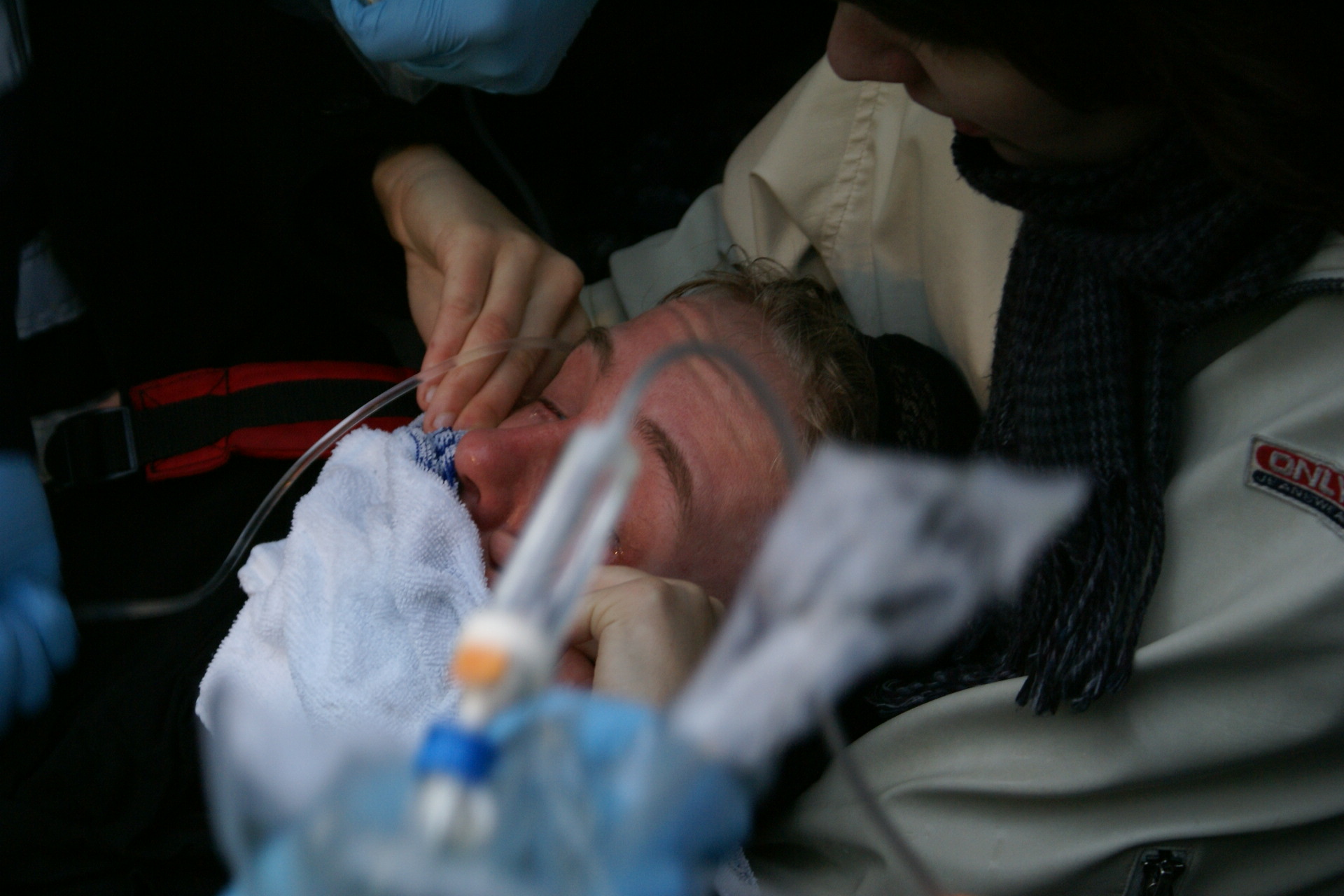
Rinsing pepper spray out of a person's eyes

A study of five often-recommended treatments for skin pain (Maalox, 2% lidocaine gel, baby shampoo, milk, or water) concluded that: "...there was no significant difference in pain relief provided by five different treatment regimens. Time after exposure appeared to be the best predictor for a decrease in pain...".

Many ambulance services and emergency departments carry saline to remove the spray. Some of the OC and CS will remain in the respiratory system, but a recovery of vision and the coordination of the eyes can be expected within 7 to 15 minutes.

Some "triple-action" pepper sprays also contain "tear gas" (CS gas), which can be neutralized with sodium metabisulfite (Campden tablets), though it is not for use on a person, only for area cleanup.

== Use ==
Pepper spray typically comes in canisters, which are often small enough to be carried or concealed in a pocket or purse. Pepper spray can also be purchased concealed in items such as rings. There are also pepper spray projectiles available, which can be fired from a paintball gun or similar platform. It has been used for years against demonstrators and aggressive animals like bears. There are also many types such as foam, gel, foggers, and spray.

=== Oleoresin capsicum ===
Oleoresin capsicum, also known as capsicum oleoresin, is also used in food and medicine. In food, it serves as a concentrated and predictable source of spiciness. The food industry has accordingly changed to prefer a combination of milder and more predictable strains of jalapeno and OC for flavoring. In medicine, OC is used in a number of products for external use.

OC used for food is generally rated between 80 000 and 500 000 SHU, roughly equivalent to 0.6-3.9% capsaicin. Paprika oleoresin is a different extract, containing very little heat and mostly used for coloring.

== Legality ==
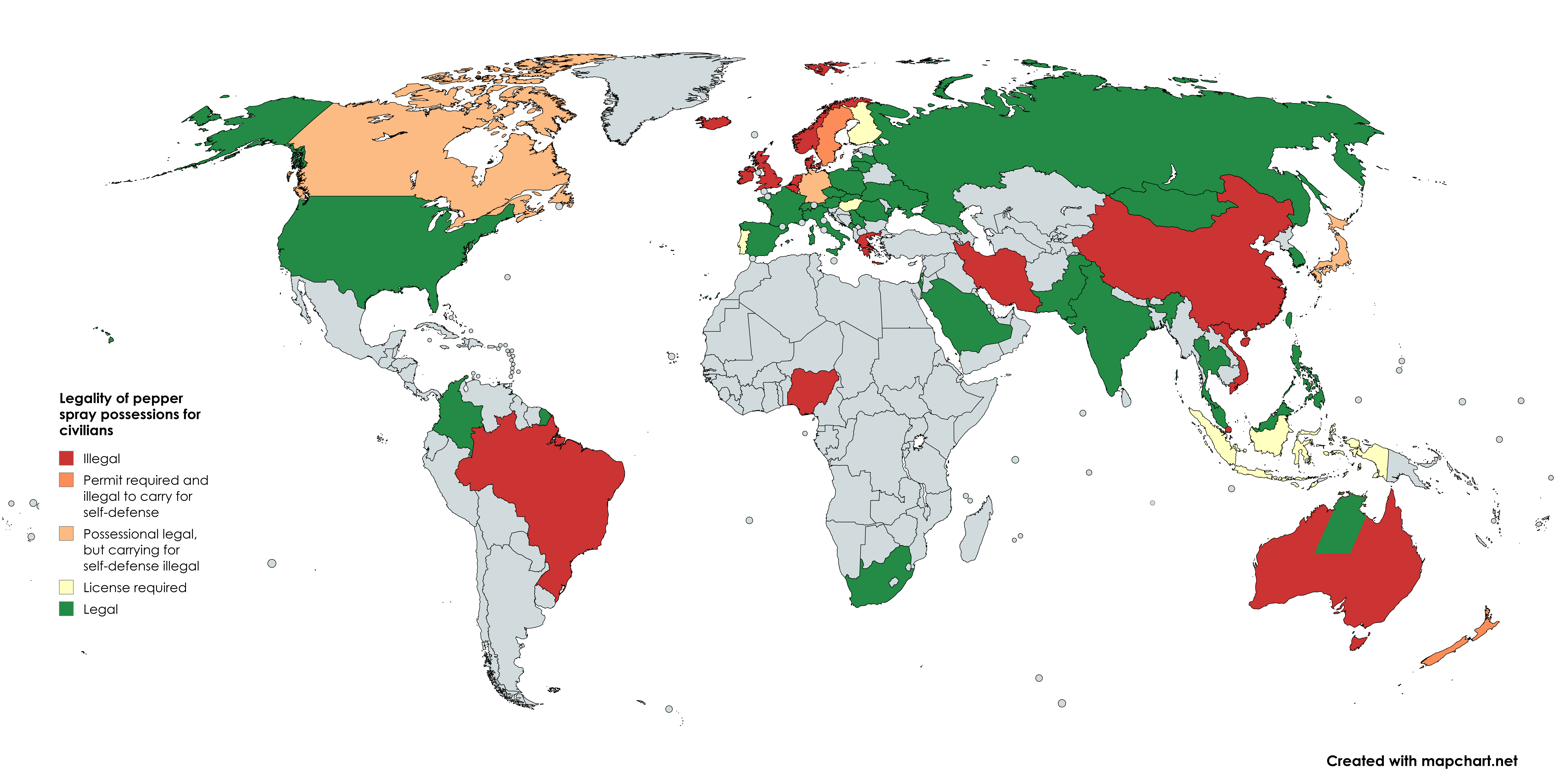
Legal status of pepper spray by country

Pepper spray is banned for use in war by Article I.5 of the Chemical Weapons Convention, which bans the use of all riot control agents in warfare whether lethal, less-than-lethal or even non-lethal. Depending on the location, it may be legal for civilians to carry and use for self-defense.

=== Africa ===
- Nigeria: Assistant Police Commissioner stated that pepper sprays are illegal for civilians to possess.
- South Africa: Pepper sprays are legal to own by civilians for self defense.

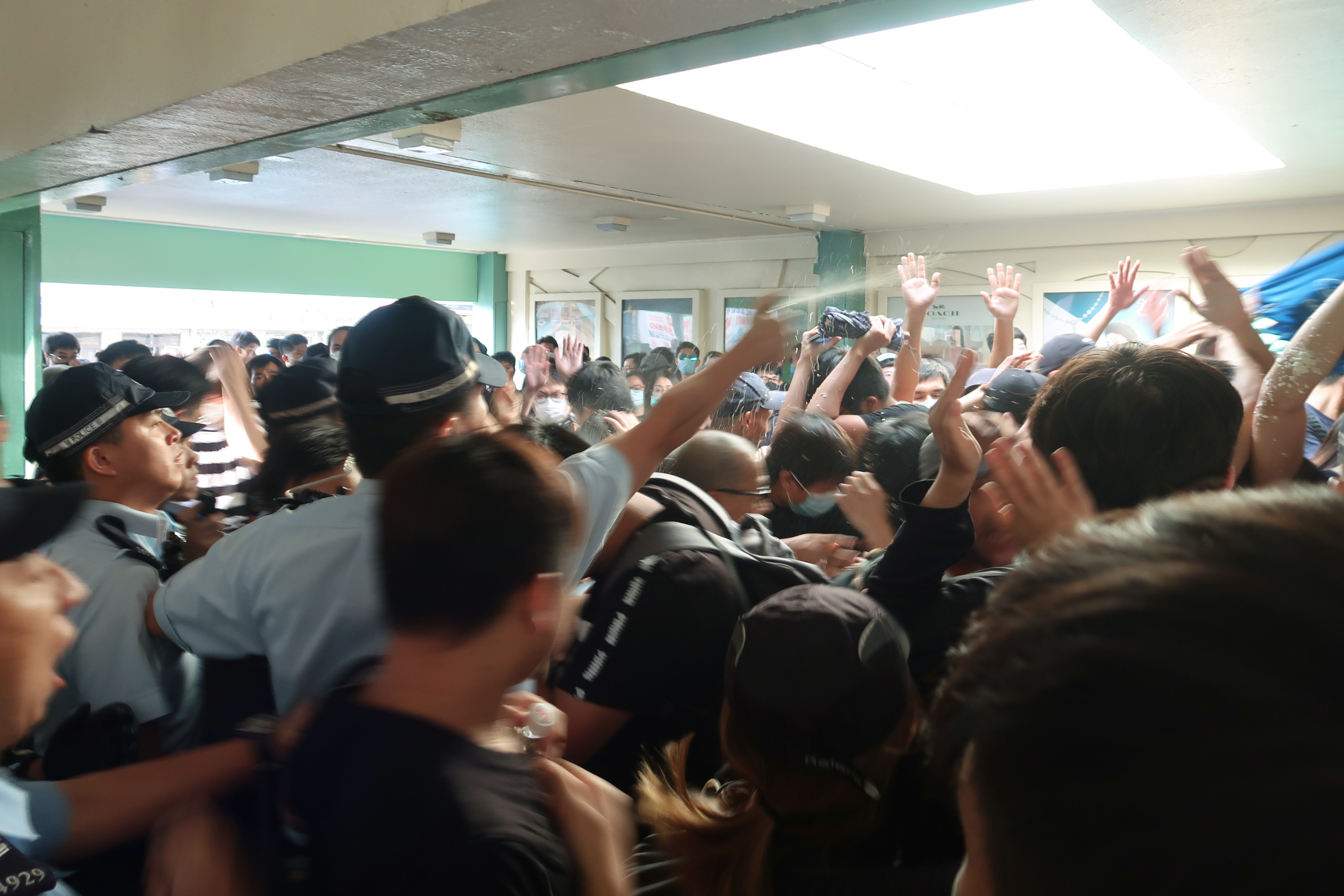
Police in Hong Kong using pepper spray in the Landmark North

=== Asia ===
- China: Forbidden for civilians, it is used only by law enforcement agencies. Underground trade leads to some civilian self-defense use.
- Hong Kong: Forbidden for civilians, it is legal to possess and use only by the members of Disciplined Services when on duty. Such devices are classified as "arms" under the "Laws of Hong Kong". Chap 238 Firearms and Ammunition Ordinance. Without a valid license from the Hong Kong Police Force, it is a crime to possess and can result in a fine of $100,000 and imprisonment for up to 14 years.
- India: Legal and sold via government-approved companies after performing a background verification.
- Israel: OC and CS spray cans may be purchased by any member of the public without restriction and carried in public. In the 1980s, a firearms license was required for doing so, but these sprays have since been deregulated.
- Japan: There are no laws against simple possession. Carrying without "justifiable grounds" is illegal and can be prosecuted as a misdemeanor. This was affirmed in a 2009 case before the Supreme Court of Japan.
- Pakistan: Possession and use for self-defense is legal and its available at physical and online stores.
- Singapore: A "noxious substance license" issued by the Singapore Police Force is required. Sprays are regulated under the Guns, Explosives and Weapons Control Act.
- Vietnam: Forbidden for civilians and used only by the police.
- Malaysia: According to the Royal Malaysian Police, it is legal for anyone aged 15 and above to purchase and carry pepper spray strictly for self-defense. Can only be purchased through licensed shops.
- Indonesia: Citing the Jakarta Metropolitan Regional Police, possession of pepper spray and use in self defense is entirely legal in Indonesia. Pepper sprays are widely sold in online marketplaces.

=== Europe ===
- Austria: Pepper spray is classified as a self-defense device and may be owned and carried by adults without registration or permission. Use against humans is justified as self-defense.
- Belgium: Pepper spray is classified as a prohibited weapon. Possession is illegal for anyone other than police officers, police agents (assistant police officers), security officers of public transport companies, soldiers and customs officers to carry a capsicum spray. It is also authorised after obtaining permission from the Minister of Internal Affairs.
- Czech Republic: Possession and carrying is legal with little restrictions. Police encourage vulnerable groups like pensioners, children, and women to carry pepper spray.
- Denmark: Individuals over age 18 can apply for a pepper spray certificate from the Danish police. Certificates are only issued to individuals at risk of violent assault (for example due to a history of stalking or domestic violence). There are additional regulations regarding the storage, importation, and manufacturing of pepper sprays.
- Finland: Possession of pepper spray requires a license. Licenses are issued for defensive purposes and to individuals working jobs where such a device is needed such as the private security sector.
- Germany: Pepper sprays labeled for the purpose of defense against animals and bearing a test mark of the Materialprüfungsanstalt (MPA, material testing institute) may be owned and carried by anyone over the age of 14. Sprays that are not labelled "animal-defence spray" or do not bear the test mark of the MPA are classified as prohibited weapons.
- Greece: Such items are illegal. They will be confiscated and possession may result in detention and arrest.
- Hungary: Civilians may carry canisters filled with maximum 20 grams (0.71 oz) of any other lachrymatory agent. There is no restriction for pepper gas pistol cartridges.
- Ireland: Possession of this spray by persons other the Garda Síochána (national police) is an offence under the Firearms and Offensive Weapons Act.
- Italy: Any citizen over 16 years of age without a criminal record could possess, carry and purchase any OC-based compounds and personal defence devices that respond to the following criteria:
  - Containing a payload not exceeding 20 ml (0.70 imp fl oz; 0.68 US fl oz), with a percentage of Oleoresin Capsicum not exceeding 10% and a maximum concentration of capsaicin and capsaicinoid substances not exceeding 2,5%;
  - Containing no flammable, corrosive, toxic or carcinogenic substances, and no other aggressive chemical compound than OC itself;
  - Being sealed when sold and featuring a safety device against accidental discharge;
  - Featuring a range not exceeding 3 m (9.8 ft).
- Latvia: Pepper spray is classified as a self-defense device and can be bought and carried by anyone over 16 years of age. Pepper spray guns can be bought and carried without any license by anyone over 18.
- Lithuania: Classified as D category weapon, can be bought and carried by anyone over 18 years of age without registration nor permission. Police also encourage vulnerable groups like pensioners or women to carry.
- Montenegro: It is legal for civilians over the age of 16 to buy, own, and carry pepper spray.
- Poland: Called precisely in Polish Penal Code "a hand-held disabling gas thrower", sprays are not considered a weapon and can be carried by anyone without further registration or permission.
- Portugal: Civilians who do not have criminal records are allowed to get police permits to purchase from gun shops, carry, and use OC sprays with a maximum concentration of 5%.
- Romania: Pepper spray is banned at sporting and cultural events, public transportation and entertainment locations (according to Penal Code 2012, art 372, (1), c).
- Russia: It is classified as a self-defense weapon and can be carried by anyone over 18. OC is not the only legal agent used. CS, CR, PAM (МПК), and (rarely) CN are also legal.
- Serbia: Pepper spray is legal under the new law as of 2016 and can be carried by anyone over the age of 16. Use against humans in self-defence is legal.
- Slovakia: It is classified as a self-defense weapon and is available to anyone over 18.
- Slovenia: Pepper spray can be legally purchased and carried by anyone older than 18 years. It can be used in cases of self-defence.
- Spain: Approved pepper spray made with 5% CS is available to anyone older than 18 years.
- Sweden: Pepper sprays are regulated under the Swedish Weapons Act. A permit is required to possess or import pepper sprays, and permits are only issued "very restrictively".

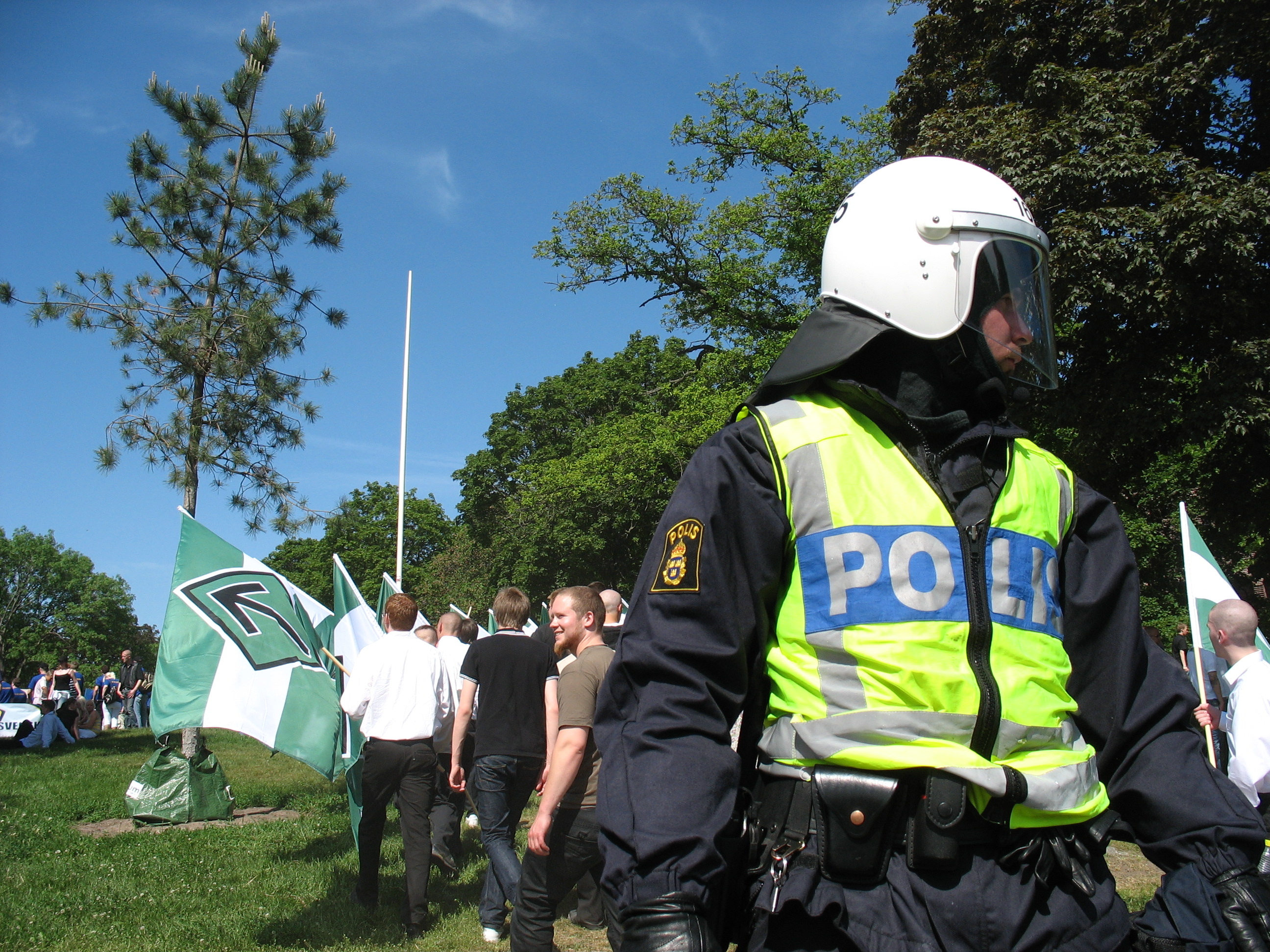
Police, like this Swedish police officer in riot gear at a 2007 demonstration, may use pepper spray to control civilians.

- Ukraine: Called legally "Tearing and irritating aerosols (gas canisters)", sprays are not considered a weapon and can be carried by anyone over 18 without further registration or permission.
- United Kingdom: Pepper spray is illegal, as is any "product that is made or adapted to cause a person injury". Police officers are exempt from this law and permitted to carry pepper spray as part of their standard equipment.

=== North America ===
- Bahamas: Pepper spray is regulated as a firearm, a license is required to possess.
- Canada: Pepper spray designed to be used against people is considered a prohibited weapon in Canada. Only law enforcement officers may legally carry or possess pepper spray labeled for use on persons. Pepper spray labelled for use on animals (commonly referred to as "bear spray" or "dog spray") is regulated under the Pest Control Products Act and can be purchased from sporting goods stores only for the purpose of animal control. Under the Criminal Code, carrying bear spray is only legal in settings where there is a risk of being attacked by an animal; it is illegal to carry bear spray with the intent of using it on another person.
- Mexico: Civilians are prohibited from possessing pepper sprays.

==== United States ====
Pepper spray can be legally purchased and carried in all 50 states and the District of Columbia. Some states regulate the maximum allowed strength of the pepper spray, age restriction, content and use:

- California: As of January 1, 1996 and as a result of Assembly Bill 830 (Speier), the pepper spray and Mace programs are now deregulated. Consumers will no longer be required to have the training, and a certificate is not required to purchase or possess these items. Pepper spray and Mace are available through gun shops, sporting goods stores, and other business outlets. California Penal Code Section 12400–12460 govern pepper spray use in California. Container holding the defense spray must contain no more than 2.5 ounces (71 g) net weight of aerosol spray. Certain individuals are still prohibited from possessing pepper spray, including minors under the age of 16, convicted felons, individuals convicted of certain drug offenses, individuals convicted of assault, and individuals convicted of misusing pepper spray.
- Federal law: It is a federal offense to carry/ship pepper spray on a commercial airliner or possess it in the secure area of an airport. When pepper spray is used in the workplace, OSHA requires a pepper spray Safety Data Sheet (SDS) be available to all employees.
- Florida: Any pepper spray containing no more than 2 ounces (57 g) of chemical can be carried in public openly or concealed without a permit. Furthermore, any such pepper spray is classified as "self-defense chemical spray" and therefore not considered a weapon under Florida law.
- Massachusetts: Before July 1, 2014, residents may purchase defense sprays only from licensed Firearms Dealers in that state, and must hold a valid Firearms Identification Card (FID) or License to Carry Firearms (LTC) to purchase or to possess outside of one's own private property. New legislations allow residents to purchase pepper spray without a Firearms Identification Card starting July 1.
- Michigan: Allows "reasonable use" of spray containing not more than 18% oleoresin capsicum to protect "a person or property under circumstances that would justify the person's use of physical force". It is illegal to distribute a "self-defense spray" to a person under 18 years of age.
- New Jersey: Non-felons over the age of 18 can possess a small amount of pepper spray, with no more than three-quarters of an ounce of chemical substance.
- New York: Can be legally possessed by any person age 18 or over. Restricted to no more than 0.67% capsaicin content. It must be purchased in person (i.e., cannot be purchased by mail-order or internet sale) either at a pharmacy or from a licensed firearm retailer and the seller must keep a record of purchases.
- Texas law makes it legal for an individual to possess a small, commercially sold container of pepper spray for personal self-defense. However, Texas law otherwise makes it illegal to carry a "Chemical dispensing device".
- Virginia: Code of Virginia § 18.2-312. Illegal use of tear gas, phosgene, and other gases. "If any person maliciously releases or cause or procure to be released in any private home, place of business or place of public gathering any tear gas, mustard gas, phosgene gas or other noxious or nauseating gases or mixtures of chemicals designed to, and capable of, producing vile or injurious or nauseating odors or gases, and bodily injury results to any person from such gas or odor, the offending person shall be guilty of a Class 3 felony. If such act be done unlawfully, but not maliciously, the offending person shall be guilty of a Class 6 felony. Nothing herein contained shall prevent the use of tear gas or other gases by police officers or other peace officers in the proper performance of their duties, or by any person or persons in the protection of the person, life or property."
- Washington: Persons over 18 may carry personal-protection spray devices. Persons over age 14 may carry personal-protection spray devices with their legal guardian's consent.
- Wisconsin: OC products with a maximum OC concentration of 10% and weight range of oleoresin of capsicum and inert ingredients of 15–60 grams (0.53–2.12 oz) are authorized to be sold to anyone over the age of 18. Further, the product cannot be camouflaged and must have a safety feature designed to prevent accidental discharge. The units may not have an effective range of over 20 feet (6.1 m) and must have an effective range of six feet (1.8 m).

=== Oceania ===
- Australia: Laws vary by state
  - Australian Capital Territory: Pepper spray is a "prohibited weapon", making it an offence to possess or use it.
  - New South Wales: Possession of pepper spray by unauthorized persons is illegal, under schedule 1 of the Weapons Prohibition Act 1998, being classified as a "prohibited weapon".
  - Northern Territory: Concealed carry of 2 cans of OC is to be made legal as of 1 September 2025 for a trial period of one year.
  - South Australia: in South Australia, possession of pepper spray without lawful excuse is illegal.
  - Western Australia: The possession of pepper spray by individuals for self-defense subject to a "reasonable excuse" test has been legal in Western Australia following the landmark Supreme Court decision in Hall v Collins [2003] WASCA 74 (4 April 2003).
  - Victoria: Schedule 3 of the Control of Weapons Regulations 2011 designates "an article designed or adapted to discharge oleoresin capsicum spray" as a prohibited weapon.
  - Queensland: in Queensland, pepper spray is considered an offensive weapon and can not be used for self-defence.
- New Zealand: Classed as a restricted weapon, a permit is required to obtain or carry pepper spray. Front-line police officers have routinely carried pepper spray since 1997. New Zealand Prison Service made OC spray available for use in approved situations in 2013. New Zealand Defence Force Military Police are permitted to carry OC spray under a special agreement due to the nature of their duties. The Scoville rating of these sprays are 500,000 (sabre MK9 HVS unit) and 2,000,000 (Sabre, cell buster fog delivery). This was as a result of excessive staff assaults and a two-year trial in ten prisons throughout the country.

== Civilian use advocacy ==
In June 2002, West Australian resident Rob Hall was convicted for using a canister of pepper spray to break up an altercation between two guests at his home in Midland. He was sentenced to a good behavior bond and granted a spent conviction order, which he appealed to the Supreme Court. Justice Christine Wheeler ruled in his favor, thereby effectively legalizing pepper spray in the state on a case-by-case basis for those who are able to show a reasonable excuse.

== See also ==
- Mace (spray)
- Offensive weapon
- Defensive weapon
- Bear spray
