= Ammonium nonanoate =

Names
- IUPAC name Ammonium nonanoate
- Other names Ammonium pelargonate; Pelargonic acid ammonium salt

Identifiers
CAS Number	63718-65-0
3D model (JSmol)	Interactive image
ChemSpider	10653407
PubChem CID	21902950
UNII	K1X429F0DP
CompTox Dashboard (EPA)	DTXSID3051387
- InChI: InChI=1S/C9H18O2.H3N/c1-2-3-4-5-6-7-8-9(10)11;/h2-8H2,1H3,(H,10,11);1H3 Key: KLIDOSBTXDALBI-UHFFFAOYSA-N; InChI=1/C9H18O2.H3N/c1-2-3-4-5-6-7-8-9(10)11;/h2-8H2,1H3,(H,10,11);1H3 Key: KLIDOSBTXDALBI-UHFFFAOYAV
- SMILES: [NH4+].[O-]C(=O)CCCCCCCC

Properties
Chemical formula	C_{9}H_{21}NO_{2}
Molar mass	175.272 g·mol^{−1}
Appearance	Colorless solution
- Except where otherwise noted, data are given for materials in their standard state (at 25 °C [77 °F], 100 kPa). verify (what is ?) Infobox references

Ammonium nonanoate is a nonsystemic, broad-spectrum contact herbicide that has no soil activity. It can be used for the suppression and control of weeds, including grasses, vines, underbrush, and annual/perennial plants, including moss, saplings, and tree suckers. Ammonium nonanoate is marketed as an aqueous solutions, at room temperature at its maximum concentration in water (40%). Solutions are colorless to pale yellow liquid with a slight fatty acid odor. It is stable in storage. Ammonium nonanoate exists as white crystals.

Ammonium nonanoate is made from ammonia and nonanoic acid, a carboxylic acid widely distributed in nature, mainly as derivatives (esters) in such foods as apples, grapes, cheese, milk, rice, beans, oranges, and potatoes and in many other nonfood sources.
