= Pelargonic acid =

9-Carbon fatty acid

Names
- Preferred IUPAC name Nonanoic acid
- Other names Nonoic acid; nonylic acid; 1-octanecarboxylic acid; C9:0 (lipid numbers)

Identifiers
CAS Number	112-05-0
3D model (JSmol)	Interactive image
Beilstein Reference	1752351
ChEBI	CHEBI:29019
ChEMBL	ChEMBL108436
ChemSpider	7866
ECHA InfoCard	100.003.574
EC Number	203-931-2
Gmelin Reference	185341
KEGG	C01601
PubChem CID	8158
UNII	97SEH7577T
CompTox Dashboard (EPA)	DTXSID3021641
- InChI: InChI=1S/C9H18O2/c1-2-3-4-5-6-7-8-9(10)11/h2-8H2,1H3,(H,10,11) Key: FBUKVWPVBMHYJY-UHFFFAOYSA-N; InChI=1/C9H18O2/c1-2-3-4-5-6-7-8-9(10)11/h2-8H2,1H3,(H,10,11) Key: FBUKVWPVBMHYJY-UHFFFAOYAF
- SMILES: CCCCCCCCC(=O)O

Properties
Chemical formula	C_{9}H_{18}O_{2}
Molar mass	158.241 g/mol
Appearance	Clear to yellowish oily liquid
Density	0.900 g/cm^{3}
Melting point	12.5 °C (54.5 °F; 285.6 K)
Boiling point	254 °C (489 °F; 527 K)
Critical point (T, P)	439 °C (712 K), 2.35 MPa
Solubility in water	0.3 g/L
Acidity (pK_{a})	4.96; 1.055 at 2.06–2.63 K (−271.09 – −270.52 °C; −455.96 – −454.94 °F); 1.53 at −191 °C (−311.8 °F; 82.1 K)
Refractive index (n_{D})	1.4322

Hazards
- Occupational safety and health (OHS/OSH)
Main hazards	Corrosive
- GHS labelling
Pictograms	(GHS05: Corrosive) (GHS07: Exclamation mark)
Signal word	Warning
Hazard statements	H315, H319, H412
Precautionary statements	P264, P273, P280, P302+P352, P305+P351+P338, P321, P332+P313, P337+P313, P362, P501
NFPA 704 (fire diamond)	3 1 0
Flash point	114 °C (237 °F; 387 K)
Autoignition temperature	405 °C (761 °F; 678 K)

Related compounds
Related compounds	Caprylic acid, Capric acid
- Except where otherwise noted, data are given for materials in their standard state (at 25 °C [77 °F], 100 kPa). Infobox references

Pelargonic acid, also called nonanoic acid, is an organic compound with structural formula CH_{3}(CH_{2})_{7}CO_{2}H. It is a nine-carbon fatty acid. Nonanoic acid is a colorless oily liquid with an unpleasant, rancid odor. It is nearly insoluble in water, but very soluble in organic solvents. The esters and salts of pelargonic acid are called pelargonates or nonanoates.

The acid is named after the pelargonium plant, since oil from its leaves contains esters of the acid. In the food industry, pelargonic acid is used as a flavouring agent and food additive. It is commonly used as a non-selective contact herbicide.

== Preparation ==
Pelargonic acid, similarly to azelaic acid, is produced industrially by the ozonolysis of oleic acid.

CH_{3}(CH_{2})_{7}CH=CH(CH_{2})_{7}CO_{2}H + O_{3} → CH_{3}(CH_{2})_{7}CO_{2}H + HO_{2}C(CH_{2})_{7}CO_{2}H

Alternatively, pelargonic acid can be produced in a two-step process beginning with coupled dimerization and hydroesterification of 1,3-butadiene. This step produces a doubly unsaturated C9-ester, which can be hydrogenated to produce esters of pelargonic acid.

2 CH_{2}=CHCH=CH_{2} + CO + CH_{3}OH → CH_{2}=CH(CH_{2})_{3}CH=CHCH_{2}CO_{2}CH_{3}
CH_{2}=CH(CH_{2})_{3}CH=CHCH_{2}CO_{2}CH_{3} + 2 H_{2} → CH_{3}(CH_{2})_{7}CO_{2}CH_{3}

A laboratory preparation involves permanganate oxidation of 1-decene.

== Occurrence and uses ==
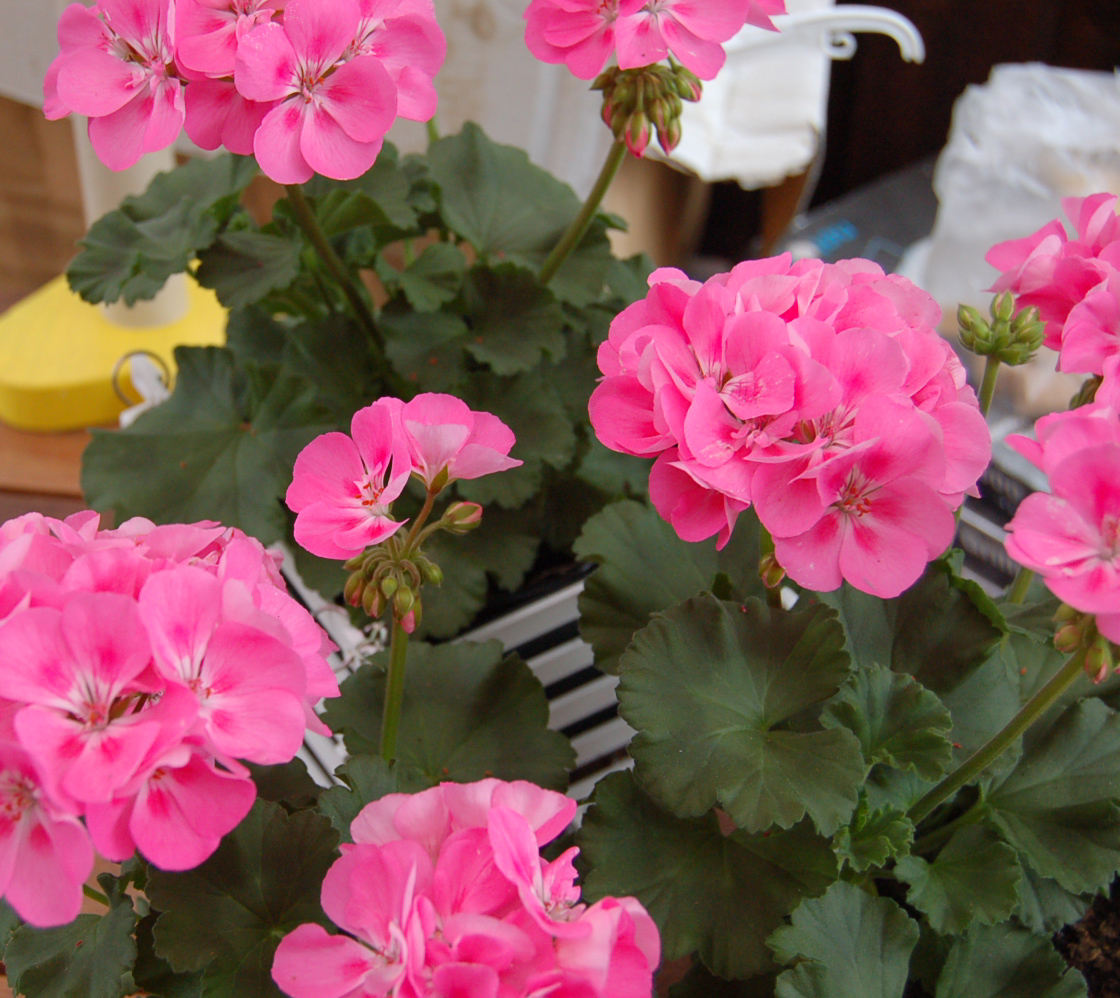
The Pelargonium plant after which the acid is named

Pelargonic acid is found naturally in many species of animals and plants including numerous fruits and vegetables such as apples, grapes, oranges, potatoes and also milk. (Note: The Environmental Protection Agency have stated that "pelargonic acid is naturally present at levels up to 224 parts per billion (ppb) in apples, 385 ppm in the skin of grapes, and 143 ppm in grape pulp. It is present in a number of other foods as well.") The esters occur in the oil of Pelargonium. It was first isolated in 1845 by Austrian chemist H. Pless from the essential oil of Pelargonium roseum. It was officially synthesized and named by Joseph Redtenbacher. Pelargonic acid was also discovered in several essential oils of French lavender, hops and rose.

The U.S. Food and Drug Administration has approved pelargonic acid as a synthetic food flavouring agent, a production aid and sanitizer to be used in contact with food and as an ingredient used commercially to peel fruits and vegetables (up to 1%). Synthetic esters of pelargonic acid, such as methyl pelargonate, are used as flavourings. Pelargonic acid is used in the preparation of plasticizers and lacquers. The derivative 4-nonanoylmorpholine is an ingredient in some pepper sprays. Esters of pelargonic acid are precursors to lubricants.

Pelargonic acid is used in household and industrial cleaning products due to its ability to dissolve and remove fatty, greasy and oily substances. In the cosmetic industry, pelargonic acid is utilized for its antimicrobial properties and is incorporated into shampoo and skin care products.

=== Herbicide ===
As a contact herbicide, pelargonic acid acts through rapid membrane disruption. From an environmental perspective its low accumulation and rapid degradation in soil make it a promising alternative for sustainable weed management. In 1995, Mycogen Corporation introduced the first pelargonic acid herbicide under the brand name Scythe, containing 57% pelargonic acid.

In the United States, pelargonic acid is not a certified organic herbicide. This is because it is manufactured using a synthetic process including ozonation which makes the material ineligible for use in organic agriculture under United States Department of Agriculture (USDA) criteria.

Ammonium pelargonate (also known as ammonium nonanoate), is a naturally derived compound created by combining pelargonic acid with ammonia. It is commonly used as a non-selective contact herbicide, for a quick burn-down effect in the control of weeds in turfgrass. It works by causing leaks in plant cell membranes, allowing chlorophyll molecules to escape the chloroplast. Under sunlight, these misplaced molecules cause immense oxidative damage to the plant. Ammonium pelargonate is approved for organic use by the USDA as it qualifies as an ammoniated soap salt of a fatty acid, whereas standalone pelargonic acid is not a soap and thus not eligible for use in USDA organic production.

In 2026, the European Commission renewed approval of pelargonic acid as an active substance in plant protection products.

Pelargonic acid is sometimes used in combination with flazasulfuron or maleic hydrazide.

The methyl form and ethylene glycol pelargonate act as nematicides against Meloidogyne javanica on Solanum lycopersicum, and the methyl against Heterodera glycines and M. incognita on Glycine max.

== Pharmacological effects ==
Pelargonic acid may be more potent than valproic acid in treating seizures. Moreover, in contrast to valproic acid, pelargonic acid exhibited no effect on HDAC inhibition, suggesting that it is unlikely to show HDAC inhibition-related teratogenicity.

== Toxicology ==
It is safe for humans to consume foods containing small amounts of pelargonic acid. Ingesting or inhaling pelargonic acid in small amounts has no known toxic effects. No risks to humans or the environment are expected when herbicide products containing pelargonic acid are used according to label directions.

Tests have revealed a low toxicity risk to birds and mammals.

== See also ==
- List of saturated fatty acids
- List of carboxylic acids
