= Oxprenoic acid =

Chemical compound

Clinical data
- Other names: Oxprenoate; 17α-Hydroxy-3-oxo-7α-propyl-17α-pregn-4-ene-21-carboxylic acid
- Drug class: Antimineralocorticoid

Identifiers
- IUPAC name: 3-[(7R,8R,9S,10R,13S,14S,17R)-17-Hydroxy-10,13-dimethyl-3-oxo-7-propyl-2,6,7,8,9,11,12,14,15,16-decahydro-1H-cyclopenta[a]phenanthren-17-yl]propanoic acid
- CAS Number: 786592-95-8
- PubChem CID: 3034004
- ChemSpider: 2298559
- UNII: 2JGY63UVRO
- ChEMBL: ChEMBL2107003
- CompTox Dashboard (EPA): DTXSID90229228

Chemical and physical data
- Formula: C_{25}H_{38}O_{4}
- Molar mass: 402.575 g·mol^{−1}
- 3D model (JSmol): Interactive image
- SMILES: CCC[C@@H]1CC2=CC(=O)CC[C@@]2([C@@H]3[C@@H]1[C@@H]4CC[C@]([C@]4(CC3)C)(CCC(=O)O)O)C
- InChI: InChI=1S/C25H38O4/c1-4-5-16-14-17-15-18(26)6-10-23(17,2)19-7-11-24(3)20(22(16)19)8-12-25(24,29)13-9-21(27)28/h15-16,19-20,22,29H,4-14H2,1-3H3,(H,27,28)/t16-,19+,20+,22-,23+,24+,25-/m1/s1; Key:DNHCHRGCTVRAFT-JEHIOXJOSA-N

Oxprenoic acid, or oxprenoate, is a synthetic steroidal antimineralocorticoid which was never marketed.

== See also ==
- Oxprenoate potassium
