= Testosterone valerate =

Chemical compound

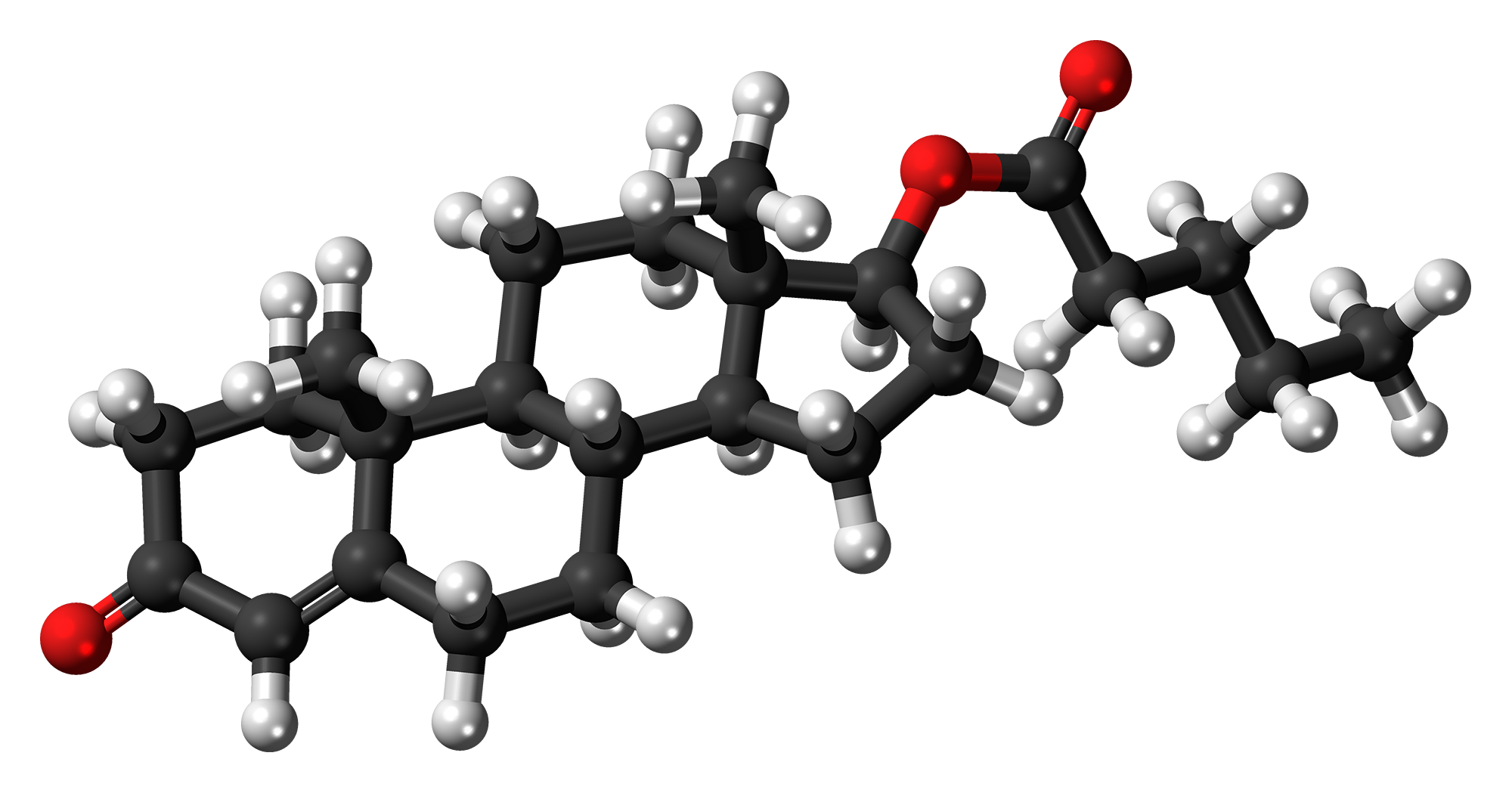

Clinical data
- Trade names: Deposterona
- Other names: Testosterone pentanoate; Testosterone 17β-valerate; Androst-4-en-17β-ol-3-one 17β-valerate
- Routes of administration: Intramuscular injection

Identifiers
- IUPAC name: [(8R,9S,10R,13S,14S,17S)-10,13-Dimethyl-3-oxo-1,2,6,7,8,9,11,12,14,15,16,17-dodecahydrocyclopenta[a]phenanthren-17-yl] pentanoate
- CAS Number: 3129-43-9
- PubChem CID: 102373
- ChemSpider: 92468
- UNII: 7SF23403A0
- CompTox Dashboard (EPA): DTXSID40185204
- ECHA InfoCard: 100.019.559

Chemical and physical data
- Formula: C_{24}H_{36}O_{3}
- Molar mass: 372.549 g·mol^{−1}
- 3D model (JSmol): Interactive image
- SMILES: CCCCC(=O)O[C@H]1CC[C@@H]2[C@@]1(CC[C@H]3[C@H]2CCC4=CC(=O)CC[C@]34C)C
- InChI: InChI=1S/C24H36O3/c1-4-5-6-22(26)27-21-10-9-19-18-8-7-16-15-17(25)11-13-23(16,2)20(18)12-14-24(19,21)3/h15,18-21H,4-14H2,1-3H3/t18-,19-,20-,21-,23-,24-/m0/s1; Key:UCNQPYVHDCHENM-CGRIZKAYSA-N

Testosterone valerate, or testosterone pentanoate, also known as androst-4-en-17β-ol-3-one 17β-valerate, is a synthetic, steroidal androgen and an androgen ester – specifically, the C17β valerate ester of testosterone – which is used in veterinary medicine. It is administered via intramuscular injection and acts as a long-lasting prodrug of testosterone. The medication is available as a component of the veterinary drug Deposterona, which is marketed in Mexico and also contains testosterone acetate and testosterone undecanoate. Testosterone valerate is a short-to-medium duration ester of testosterone, with an elimination half-life of approximately twice that of the short-acting testosterone propionate.

== See also ==
- Testosterone acetate/testosterone undecanoate/testosterone valerate
- Testosterone propionate/testosterone valerate/testosterone undecylenate
- List of androgen esters § Testosterone esters
