= Testosterone undecylenate =

Chemical compound

Clinical data
- Trade names: Durasteron, Triolandren (mixtures)
- Other names: TUe; Testosterone undecenoate; 17β-Hydroxyandrost-4-en-3-one 17β-(undec-10-enoate)
- Routes of administration: Intramuscular injection
- Drug class: Androgen; Anabolic steroid; Androgen ester

Identifiers
- IUPAC name: [(8R,9S,10R,13S,14S,17S)-10,13-dimethyl-3-oxo-1,2,6,7,8,9,11,12,14,15,16,17-dodecahydrocyclopenta[a]phenanthren-17-yl] undec-10-enoate
- CAS Number: 29430-26-0
- PubChem CID: 9846790
- ChemSpider: 21229627
- UNII: KU65V22IOU
- CompTox Dashboard (EPA): DTXSID10951953
- ECHA InfoCard: 100.045.099

Chemical and physical data
- Formula: C_{30}H_{46}O_{3}
- Molar mass: 454.695 g·mol^{−1}
- 3D model (JSmol): Interactive image
- SMILES: C[C@]12CC[C@H]3[C@H]([C@@H]1CC[C@@H]2OC(=O)CCCCCCCCC=C)CCC4=CC(=O)CC[C@]34C
- InChI: InChI=1S/C30H46O3/c1-4-5-6-7-8-9-10-11-12-28(32)33-27-16-15-25-24-14-13-22-21-23(31)17-19-29(22,2)26(24)18-20-30(25,27)3/h4,21,24-27H,1,5-20H2,2-3H3/t24-,25-,26-,27-,29-,30-/m0/s1; Key:PBFYIQCFOZXSKC-CNQKSJKFSA-N

Testosterone undecylenate (TUe) is an androgen/anabolic steroid medication and androgen ester which is no longer marketed. It was a component of Durasteron and Triolandren, long-acting mixtures of testosterone esters in oil solution that were administered by intramuscular injection.

== See also ==
- Boldenone undecylenate
- Testosterone propionate/testosterone enanthate/testosterone undecylenate
- Testosterone propionate/testosterone valerate/testosterone undecylenate
- List of androgen esters § Testosterone esters
