= 4-Nonanoylmorpholine =

Names
- Preferred IUPAC name 1-(Morpholin-4-yl)nonan-1-one
- Other names 4-(1-Oxononyl)morpholine, N-Nonanoylmorpholine, 1-(4-Morpholino)-1-nonanone, 4-Morpholinenonylic acid, Pelargonic acid morpholide, Pelargonic morpholide, N-Morpholino nonanamide, 1-Morpholin-4-ylnonan-1-one, 4-Nonanoylmorpholine, MPA, MPK

Identifiers
| CAS Number | 5299-64-9 |
| 3D model (JSmol) | Interactive image; Interactive image |
| ChemSpider | 71509 |
| PubChem CID | 79182 |
| UNII | 0D2NEP40LU |
| CompTox Dashboard (EPA) | DTXSID70201022 |
- InChI: InChI=1S/C13H25NO2/c1-2-3-4-5-6-7-8-13(15)14-9-11-16-12-10-14/h2-12H2,1H3 Key: NBRDJXSTGSUITP-UHFFFAOYSA-N; InChI=1/C13H25NO2/c1-2-3-4-5-6-7-8- 13(15)14-9-11-16-12-10-14/h2-12H2,1H3; InChI=1/C13H25NO2/c1-2-3-4-5-6-7-8-13(15)14-9-11-16-12-10-14/h2-12H2,1H3 Key: NBRDJXSTGSUITP-UHFFFAOYAS
- SMILES: CCCCCCCCC(=O)N1CCOCC1; O=C(N1CCOCC1)CCCCCCCC

Properties
| Chemical formula | C_{13}H_{25}NO_{2} |
| Molar mass | 227.34 g/mol |
| Appearance | Liquid |
| Boiling point | 310 to 315 °C (590 to 599 °F; 583 to 588 K) |
| Solubility in water | Insoluble |
- Except where otherwise noted, data are given for materials in their standard state (at 25 °C [77 °F], 100 kPa). verify (what is ?) Infobox references

4-Nonanoylmorpholine [pelargonic acid morpholide, N-nonanoylmorpholine, MPK or МПК (for Russian: морфолид пеларгоновой кислоты), or MPA] is an amide of pelargonic acid and morpholine. It is an ingredient of tear gas.

== Properties ==
4-Nonanoylmorpholine was first synthesized in 1954 by L. M. Rice, from morpholine and acyl chloride of pelargonic acid.

It is a liquid insoluble in water and soluble in polar organic solvents (e.g. acetone, propanol, and dimethyl formamide) and fats. Its volatility is 27 mg/m^{3} at 20 °C and 43 mg/m^{3} at 35 °C.

== Uses ==
It is a used as a solvent in lachrymatory formulations containing CR gas or CS gas. It is reported to be effective against dogs and starts being effective in concentrations of over 20–40 mg•min/m^{3}. It is considered very safe, with high differences between effective and toxic concentrations. At one time it was reportedly used as food seasoning with no reported adverse effects. However, its effectiveness when used alone is rather low even in the highest permitted concentration, so it is almost always used in combination with CR gas or CS gas, commonly referred to as tear gas. In that combination, this blend is effective even against dogs and people under influence of alcohol or other drugs. Its effect usually lasts for 15–30 minutes.

MPK blends with CR gas or CS gas are common personal self-defense chemical agents in Russia and Ukraine, but is virtually unknown elsewhere.

4-Nonanoylmorpholine has been reported to have insect repellent properties in Aedes aegypti mosquitoes.
