= Terpestacin =

Names
- Preferred IUPAC name (3aR,5E,7S,10E,14E,16aS)-2,7-Dihydroxy-3-[(2S)-1-hydroxypropan-2-yl]-6,10,14,16a-tetramethyl-4,7,8,9,12,13,16,16a-octahydrocyclopenta[15]annulen-1(3aH)-one

Identifiers
| CAS Number | 146436-22-8 |
| 3D model (JSmol) | Interactive image |
| ChEBI | CHEBI:167861 |
| ChEMBL | ChEMBL1669042 |
| ChemSpider | 4976965 |
| PubChem CID | 6475118 |
| UNII | GF9UM66CY6 |
| CompTox Dashboard (EPA) | DTXSID701017681 |
- InChI: InChI=1S/C25H38O4/c1-16-7-6-8-17(2)13-14-25(5)20(11-10-18(3)21(27)12-9-16)22(19(4)15-26)23(28)24(25)29/h7,10,13,19-21,26-28H,6,8-9,11-12,14-15H2,1-5H3/b16-7+,17-13+,18-10+/t19-,20-,21+,25+/m1/s1 Key: UTGBBPSEQPITLF-IXRUDUFRSA-N; InChI=1/C25H38O4/c1-16-7-6-8-17(2)13-14-25(5)20(11-10-18(3)21(27)12-9-16)22(19(4)15-26)23(28)24(25)29/h7,10,13,19-21,26-28H,6,8-9,11-12,14-15H2,1-5H3/b16-7+,17-13+,18-10+/t19-,20-,21+,25+/m1/s1 Key: UTGBBPSEQPITLF-IXRUDUFRBX
- SMILES: C/C/1=C\CC/C(=C/C[C@]2([C@H](C/C=C(/[C@H](CC1)O)\C)C(=C(C2=O)O)[C@H](C)CO)C)/C

Properties
| Chemical formula | C_{25}H_{38}O_{4} |
| Molar mass | 402.575 g·mol^{−1} |
- Except where otherwise noted, data are given for materials in their standard state (at 25 °C [77 °F], 100 kPa). Infobox references

Terpestacin is a fungal metabolite first isolated from Arthrinium.

In preliminary research, it has been studied for its potential anti-HIV and anti-cancer potential.

A laboratory synthesis of terpestacin has been reported.
