= Methandriol =

Chemical compound

Clinical data
- Trade names: Crestabolic, Cytobolin, Diandren, Madiol, Stenediol, Mestenediol
- Other names: Metandriol; Methylandrostenediol; Methyl-5-androstenediol; Methylandrostenediole; 17α-Methylandrost-5-ene-3β,17β-diol
- Routes of administration: By mouth
- Drug class: Androgen; Anabolic steroid

Legal status
- Legal status: BR: Class C5 (Anabolic steroids)

Identifiers
- IUPAC name: (3S,8S,9R,10R,13S,14R,17S)-10,13,17-trimethyl-1,2,3,4,7,8,9,11,12,14,15,16-dodecahydrocyclopenta[a]phenanthrene-3,17-diol
- CAS Number: 521-10-8
- PubChem CID: 229021
- ChemSpider: 199375
- UNII: 5730Z864KG
- CompTox Dashboard (EPA): DTXSID50878534
- ECHA InfoCard: 100.007.548

Chemical and physical data
- Formula: C_{20}H_{32}O_{2}
- Molar mass: 304.474 g·mol^{−1}
- 3D model (JSmol): Interactive image
- SMILES: C[C@]12CC[C@@H](CC1=CC[C@@H]3[C@@H]2CC[C@]4([C@H]3CC[C@]4(C)O)C)O
- InChI: InChI=1S/C20H32O2/c1-18-9-6-14(21)12-13(18)4-5-15-16(18)7-10-19(2)17(15)8-11-20(19,3)22/h4,14-17,21-22H,5-12H2,1-3H3/t14-,15+,16-,17-,18-,19-,20-/m0/s1; Key:WRWBCPJQPDHXTJ-DTMQFJJTSA-N

Methandriol (brand names Anabol, Crestabolic, Cytobolin, Diandren, Durabolic, Madiol, Mestenediol, Methabolic, Methydiol, Sterabolic, Stenediol), also known as methylandrostenediol, is an androgen and anabolic steroid (AAS) medication which was developed by Organon and is used in both oral and injectable (as methandriol dipropionate, methandriol propionate, or methandriol bisenanthoyl acetate) formulations. It is an orally active 17α-alkylated AAS and a derivative of the endogenous androgen prohormone androstenediol.

== Medical uses ==
Methandriol has been used in the treatment of breast cancer in women. It has been reported to be almost as virilizing as comparable doses of testosterone propionate and methyltestosterone in women.

=== Available forms ===
Methandriol (brand name Androteston M, Notandron, Protandren) was previously marketed as 25 mL and 50 mg/mL aqueous suspensions for use by intramuscular injection.

== Chemistry ==
Methandriol, also known as 17α-methyl-5-androstenediol or as 17α-methylandrost-5-ene-3β,17β-diol, is a synthetic androstane steroid and a 17α-alkylated derivative of 5-androstenediol (androst-5-ene-3β,17β-diol). A number of esters of methandriol exist, including methandriol dipropionate (methylandrostenediol 3β,17β-dipropionate), methandriol propionate (methylandrostenediol 3β-propionate), methandriol bisenanthoyl acetate (methylandrostenediol 3β,17β-dioxononanoate), and methandriol diacetate (methylandrostenediol 3β,17β-diacetate; never marketed). Methandriol is closely related to methyltestosterone (17α-methyltestosterone or 17α-methylandrost-4-ene-17β-ol-3-one).

An analogue of methandriol is its positional isomer methyl-4-androstenediol (17α-methylandrost-4-ene-3β,17β-diol). Another analogue of methandriol is ethynylandrostanediol (17α-ethynyl-5α-androstane-3β,17β-diol) as well as its ester ethandrostate (ethynylandrostanediol 3β-cyclohexylpropionate).

== History ==
Methandriol was first synthesized in 1935 along with methyltestosterone and mestanolone.

Androgen/anabolic steroid dosages for breast cancer
Route	Medication	Form	Dosage
Oral	Methyltestosterone	Tablet	30–200 mg/day
Oral	Fluoxymesterone	Tablet	10–40 mg 3x/day
Oral	Calusterone	Tablet	40–80 mg 4x/day
Oral	Normethandrone	Tablet	40 mg/day
Buccal	Methyltestosterone	Tablet	25–100 mg/day
Injection (IM or SC)	Testosterone propionate	Oil solution	50–100 mg 3x/week
Injection (IM or SC)	Testosterone enanthate	Oil solution	200–400 mg 1x/2–4 weeks
Injection (IM or SC)	Testosterone cypionate	Oil solution	200–400 mg 1x/2–4 weeks
Injection (IM or SC)	Mixed testosterone esters	Oil solution	250 mg 1x/week
Injection (IM or SC)	Methandriol	Aqueous suspension	100 mg 3x/week
Injection (IM or SC)	Androstanolone (DHT)	Aqueous suspension	300 mg 3x/week
Injection (IM or SC)	Drostanolone propionate	Oil solution	100 mg 1–3x/week
Injection (IM or SC)	Metenolone enanthate	Oil solution	400 mg 3x/week
Injection (IM or SC)	Nandrolone decanoate	Oil solution	50–100 mg 1x/1–3 weeks
Injection (IM or SC)	Nandrolone phenylpropionate	Oil solution	50–100 mg/week
Note: Dosages are not necessarily equivalent. Sources: See template.

== Society and culture ==
=== Generic names ===
Methandriol is the generic name of methylandrostenediol and its INN.

=== Availability ===
Methandriol remains marketed for clinical use only in Taiwan and for veterinary use (as methandriol dipropionate) only in Australia.
