= Androstenediol dipropionate =

Chemical compound

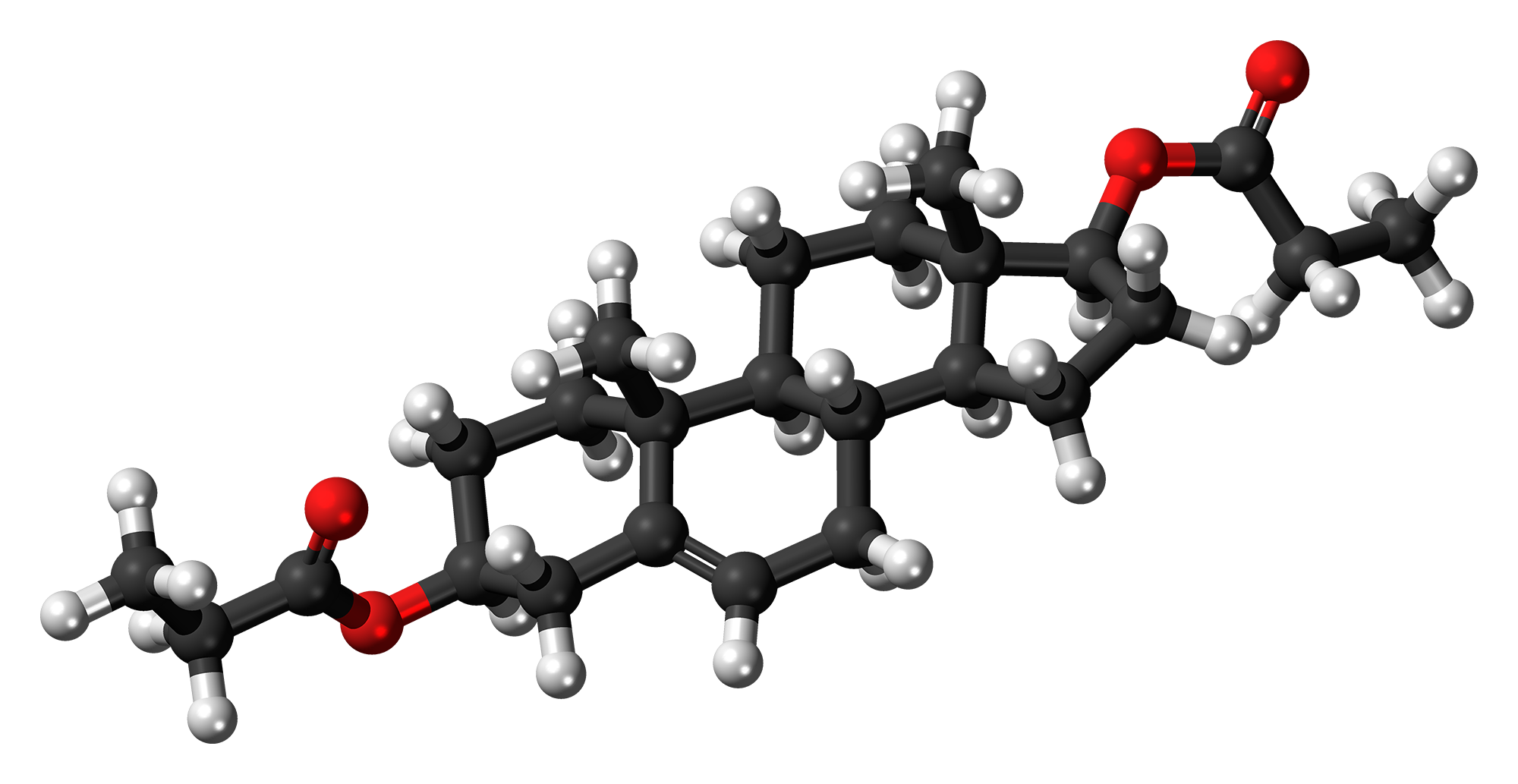

Clinical data
- Trade names: Bisexovis, Bisexovister, Ginandrin, Stenandiol
- Other names: 5-Androstenediol 3β,17β-dipropionate; Androst-5-ene-3β,17β-diol 3β,17β-dipropionate
- Routes of administration: Intramuscular injection
- Drug class: Androgen; Anabolic steroid; Androgen ester

Identifiers
- IUPAC name: [(3S,8R,9S,10R,13S,14S,17S)-10,13-Dimethyl-17-propanoyloxy-2,3,4,7,8,9,11,12,14,15,16,17-dodecahydro-1H-cyclopenta[a]phenanthren-3-yl] propanoate
- CAS Number: 2297-30-5
- PubChem CID: 16805
- ChemSpider: 15928
- UNII: B8PUA3O92E
- CompTox Dashboard (EPA): DTXSID50878670
- ECHA InfoCard: 100.017.222

Chemical and physical data
- Formula: C_{25}H_{38}O_{4}
- Molar mass: 402.575 g·mol^{−1}
- 3D model (JSmol): Interactive image
- SMILES: CCC(=O)O[C@H]1CC[C@@]2([C@H]3CC[C@]4([C@H]([C@@H]3CC=C2C1)CC[C@@H]4OC(=O)CC)C)C
- InChI: InChI=1S/C25H38O4/c1-5-22(26)28-17-11-13-24(3)16(15-17)7-8-18-19-9-10-21(29-23(27)6-2)25(19,4)14-12-20(18)24/h7,17-21H,5-6,8-15H2,1-4H3/t17-,18-,19-,20-,21-,24-,25-/m0/s1; Key:ZDDFOEZPFDWEQS-YMKPZFJOSA-N

Androstenediol dipropionate (brand names Bisexovis, Bisexovister, Ginandrin, Stenandiol), or 5-androstenediol 3β,17β-dipropionate, also known as androst-5-ene-3β,17β-diol 3β,17β-dipropionate, is a synthetic anabolic–androgenic steroid and an androgen ester – specifically, the dipropionate diester of 5-androstenediol (androst-5-ene-3β,17β-diol) – which has been marketed in Europe, including in Spain, Italy, and Austria.

== See also ==
- List of androgen esters
