= Methandriol diacetate =

Chemical compound

Clinical data
- Other names: Methylandrostenediol diacetate; 17α-Methylandrost-5-ene-3β,17β-diol 3β,17β-diacetate
- Routes of administration: Intramuscular injection

Identifiers
- IUPAC name: [(3S,8R,9S,10R,13S,14S,17S)-17-Acetyloxy-10,13,17-trimethyl-1,2,3,4,7,8,9,11,12,14,15,16-dodecahydrocyclopenta[a]phenanthren-3-yl] acetate
- CAS Number: 2061-86-1
- PubChem CID: 102203
- ChemSpider: 92334
- UNII: Z142SX9228
- CompTox Dashboard (EPA): DTXSID80942797
- ECHA InfoCard: 100.016.516

Chemical and physical data
- Formula: C_{24}H_{36}O_{4}
- Molar mass: 388.548 g·mol^{−1}
- 3D model (JSmol): Interactive image
- SMILES: CC(=O)O[C@H]1CC[C@@]2([C@H]3CC[C@]4([C@H]([C@@H]3CC=C2C1)CC[C@]4(C)OC(=O)C)C)C
- InChI: InChI=1S/C24H36O4/c1-15(25)27-18-8-11-22(3)17(14-18)6-7-19-20(22)9-12-23(4)21(19)10-13-24(23,5)28-16(2)26/h6,18-21H,7-14H2,1-5H3/t18-,19+,20-,21-,22-,23-,24-/m0/s1; Key:HHCVPHSEENQSLU-IWMXCVPLSA-N

Methandriol diacetate, or methylandrostenediol diacetate, also known as 17α-methylandrost-5-ene-3β,17β-diol 3β,17β-diacetate, is a synthetic, injected anabolic–androgenic steroid (AAS) and a 17α-alkylated derivative of 5-androstenediol that was never marketed. It is an androgen ester – specifically, the C3,17β diacetate ester of methandriol (17α-methyl-5-androstenediol) – and acts as a prodrug of methandriol in the body.

== See also ==
- Methandriol bisenanthoyl acetate
- Methandriol dipropionate
- Methandriol propionate
- Bolandiol dipropionate
