= Testosterone acetate =

Chemical compound

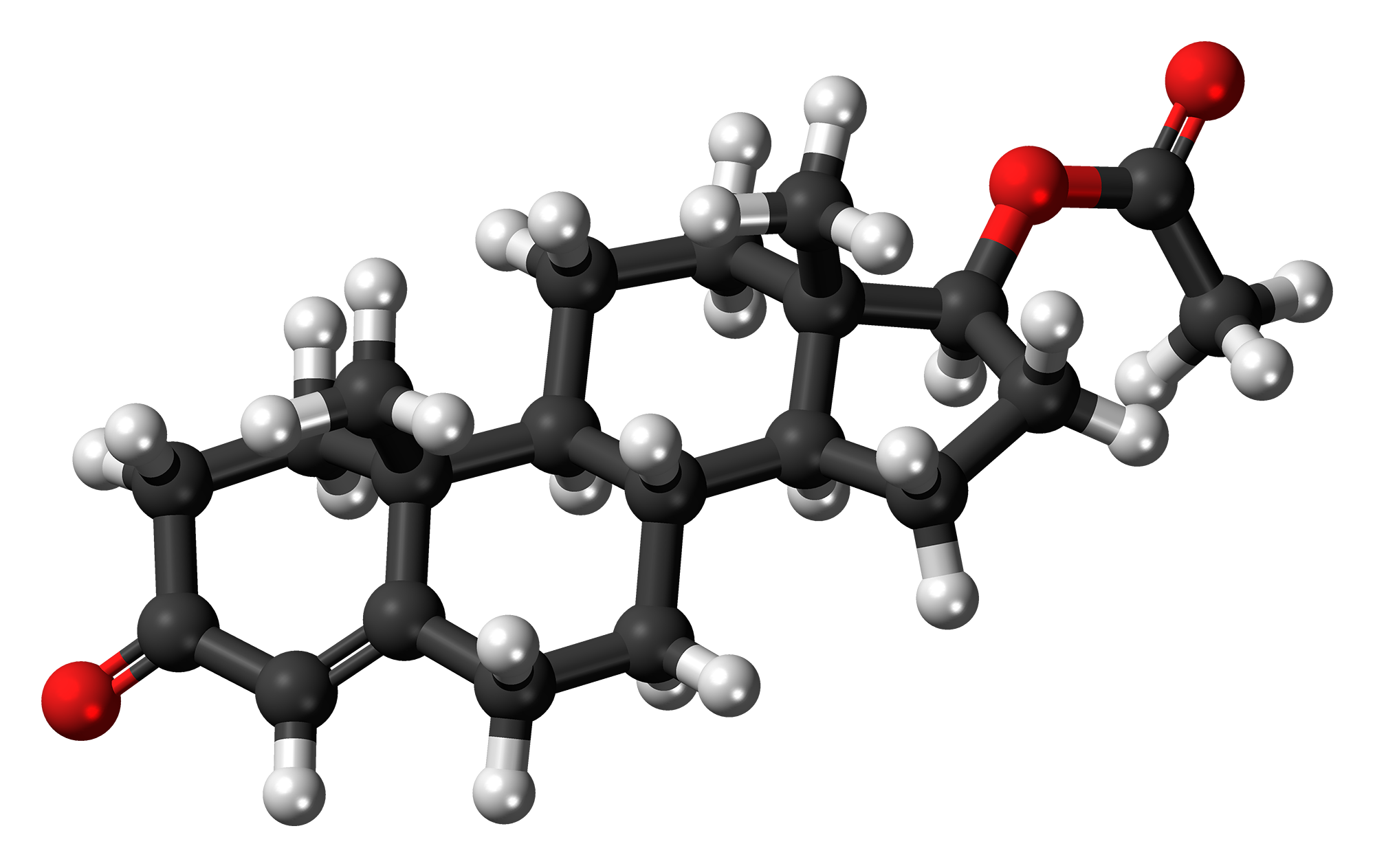

Clinical data
- Trade names: Aceto-Sterandryl, Aceto-Testoviron, Amolisin, Androtest A, Deposteron, Farmatest, Perandrone A
- Other names: Testosterone ethanoate; Testosterone 17β-acetate; Androst-4-en-17β-ol-3-one 17β-acetate
- Routes of administration: Intramuscular injection

Identifiers
- IUPAC name: [(8R,9S,10R,13S,14S,17S)-10,13-dimethyl-3-oxo-1,2,6,7,8,9,11,12,14,15,16,17-dodecahydrocyclopenta[a]phenanthren-17-yl] acetate
- CAS Number: 1045-69-8
- PubChem CID: 92145
- ChemSpider: 83191
- UNII: 5652105Y6S
- KEGG: C03027
- ChEBI: CHEBI:16524
- ChEMBL: ChEMBL488762
- CompTox Dashboard (EPA): DTXSID80909007
- ECHA InfoCard: 100.012.615

Chemical and physical data
- Formula: C_{21}H_{30}O_{3}
- Molar mass: 330.468 g·mol^{−1}
- 3D model (JSmol): Interactive image
- SMILES: CC(=O)O[C@H]1CC[C@@H]2[C@@]1(CC[C@H]3[C@H]2CCC4=CC(=O)CC[C@]34C)C
- InChI: InChI=1S/C21H30O3/c1-13(22)24-19-7-6-17-16-5-4-14-12-15(23)8-10-20(14,2)18(16)9-11-21(17,19)3/h12,16-19H,4-11H2,1-3H3/t16-,17-,18-,19-,20-,21-/m0/s1; Key:DJPZSBANTAQNFN-PXQJOHHUSA-N

Testosterone acetate (brand names Aceto-Sterandryl, Aceto-Testoviron, Amolisin, Androtest A, Deposteron, Farmatest, Perandrone A), or testosterone ethanoate, also known as androst-4-en-17β-ol-3-one 17β-acetate, is an androgen and anabolic steroid and a testosterone ester. The drug was first described in 1936 and was one of the first androgen esters and esters of testosterone to be synthesized.

== See also ==
- List of androgen esters
