= Methandriol bisenanthoyl acetate =

Chemical compound

Clinical data
- Trade names: Notandron-Depot
- Other names: Methandriol dioxononanoate; Methylandrostenediol dioxononanoate; Methandriol bisoxononanoate; Methylandrostenediol bisoxononanoate; 17α-Methylandrost-5-ene-3,17β-diol 3,17β-di(3-oxononanoate)
- Routes of administration: Intramuscular injection

Identifiers
- IUPAC name: (1S,2R,10R,11S,14R,15S)-2,14,15-Trimethyl-5-[(3-oxononanoyl)oxy]tetracyclo[8.7.0.0^{2},^{7}.0^{11},^{15}]heptadec-7-en-14-yl 3-oxononanoate
- CAS Number: 94030-88-3
- PubChem CID: 44150473
- ChemSpider: 21166566
- UNII: CWJ68H3GX2
- CompTox Dashboard (EPA): DTXSID90916621

Chemical and physical data
- Formula: C_{38}H_{60}O_{6}
- Molar mass: 612.892 g·mol^{−1}
- 3D model (JSmol): Interactive image
- SMILES: CCCCCCC(=O)CC(=O)OC1CC[C@]2(C)[C@H]3CC[C@@]4(C)[C@@H](CC[C@@]4(C)OC(=O)CC(=O)CCCCCC)[C@@H]3CC=C2C1
- InChI: InChI=1S/C38H60O6/c1-6-8-10-12-14-28(39)25-34(41)43-30-18-21-36(3)27(24-30)16-17-31-32(36)19-22-37(4)33(31)20-23-38(37,5)44-35(42)26-29(40)15-13-11-9-7-2/h16,30-33H,6-15,17-26H2,1-5H3/t30?,31-,32+,33+,36?,37?,38-/m1/s1; Key:ASAWDXJIGAVOBY-JXCMQCOYSA-N

Methandriol bisenanthoyl acetate (brand name Notandron-Depot), or methylandrostenediol bisenanthoyl acetate, also known as 17α-methylandrost-5-ene-3β,17β-diol 3β,17β-di(3-oxononanoate), is a synthetic, injected anabolic–androgenic steroid (AAS) and a 17α-alkylated derivative of 5-androstenediol. It is an androgen ester—specifically, the C3β,17β di(3-oxononanoate) (or dienanthoylacetate) ester of methandriol (17α-methyl-5-androstenediol)—and acts as a prodrug of methandriol in the body. Methandriol bisenanthoyl acetate is administered by intramuscular injection and, relative to methandriol, has an extended duration via this route due to a depot effect afforded by its ester.

== See also ==
- Methandriol diacetate
- Methandriol dipropionate
- Methandriol propionate
- Bolandiol dipropionate
