= Methandriol dipropionate =

Chemical compound

Clinical data
- Trade names: Arbolic, Durabolic, Or-Bolic, Probolik, Protabolin
- Other names: Methylandrostenediol dipropionate; Methylandrostenediol 3β,17β-dipropionate; MADP; 17α-Methylandrost-5-ene-3β,17β-diol 3,17β-dipropionate
- Routes of administration: Intramuscular injection
- Drug class: Androgen; Anabolic steroid; Androgen ester

Identifiers
- IUPAC name: [(3S,8R,9S,10R,13S,14S,17S)-10,13,17-trimethyl-17-propanoyloxy-1,2,3,4,7,8,9,11,12,14,15,16-dodecahydrocyclopenta[a]phenanthren-3-yl] propanoate
- CAS Number: 3593-85-9
- PubChem CID: 546836
- ChemSpider: 96675
- UNII: 8XIW70Q5I3
- KEGG: D08197
- ChEBI: CHEBI:34835
- CompTox Dashboard (EPA): DTXSID801016686
- ECHA InfoCard: 100.020.669

Chemical and physical data
- Formula: C_{26}H_{40}O_{4}
- Molar mass: 416.602 g·mol^{−1}
- 3D model (JSmol): Interactive image
- SMILES: CCC(=O)O[C@H]1CC[C@@]2([C@H]3CC[C@]4([C@H]([C@@H]3CC=C2C1)CC[C@]4(C)OC(=O)CC)C)C
- InChI: InChI=1S/C26H40O4/c1-6-22(27)29-18-10-13-24(3)17(16-18)8-9-19-20(24)11-14-25(4)21(19)12-15-26(25,5)30-23(28)7-2/h8,18-21H,6-7,9-16H2,1-5H3/t18-,19+,20-,21-,24-,25-,26-/m0/s1; Key:YUKFLTKJFMBYJM-QNSWYLPSSA-N

Methandriol dipropionate (MADP), also known as methylandrostenediol dipropionate and sold under the brand names Arbolic, Durabolic, Or-Bolic, Probolik, and Protabolin among others, is a synthetic, injected anabolic-androgenic steroid (AAS) and a 17α-alkylated derivative of 5-androstenediol. It is an androgen ester – specifically, the C3,17β dipropionate ester of methandriol (17α-methyl-5-androstenediol) – and acts as a prodrug of methandriol in the body. Methandriol dipropionate is administered by intramuscular injection and, relative to methandriol, has an extended duration via this route of several days due to a depot effect afforded by its ester. It was marketed in the United States, but is no longer available in this country.

== See also ==
- List of androgen esters § Esters of other synthetic AAS
- Estradiol benzoate/progesterone/methandriol dipropionate
