= Blue sage =

Blue sage is a common name for several plants:

- Eranthemum nervosum
- Salvia azurea, native to central and eastern North America
- Salvia clevelandii, native to western North America
- Salvia nemorosa, native to central Europe and western Asia
- Salvia pachyphylla, native to California, Nevada, and Arizona
