= C20H28O3 =

The molecular formula C_{20}H_{28}O_{3} may refer to:

- Cafestol
- Enestebol
- Gestonorone
- Mytatrienediol
- Nandrolone acetate
- Pachyphyllone
- Petasin
- Taxodone
- Testosterone formate
- Lambertianic acid
