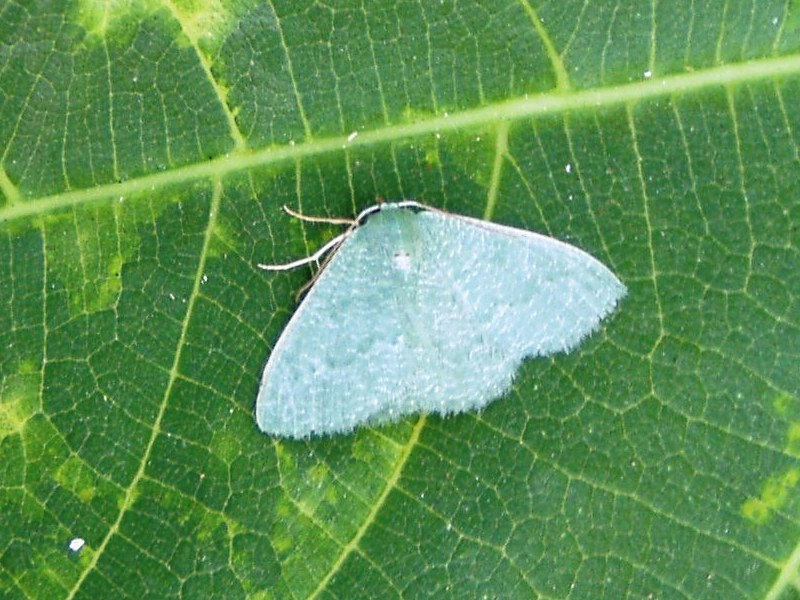

Scientific classification
- Domain: Eukaryota
- Kingdom: Animalia
- Phylum: Arthropoda
- Class: Insecta
- Order: Lepidoptera
- Family: Geometridae
- Genus: Phaiogramma
- Species: P. etruscaria

Binomial name
- Phaiogramma etruscaria (Zeller, 1849)

Synonyms
- Geometra etruscaria Zeller, 1849; Nemoria pulmentaria Guenee, 1858; Phaiogramma pulmentaria (Guenée, 1858); Chlorissa pulmentaria (Guenée, 1858)

= Phaiogramma etruscaria =

Species of moth

Phaiogramma etruscaria is a species of moth of the family Geometridae.

== Description ==
Phaiogramma etruscaria has a wingspan reaching 17.7-19.3 mm in males, 20-23.3 mm in the females. Wings are light green, with clearly visible white antemedial lines and small marbled striations. Hind tibia bear only terminal spurs in males, two pairs of spurs in females. Antennae are ciliate in males, while in females they are filiform. Adults are on wing from May to June. There is one generation per year. The pupae overwinter.

The larvae are polyphagous and feed on various Apiaceae (Anethum graveolens, Bupleurum, Foeniculum vulgare, Daucus, Ferula, Peucedanum) and on Thapsus, Lotus, Clematis and Rosmarinus.

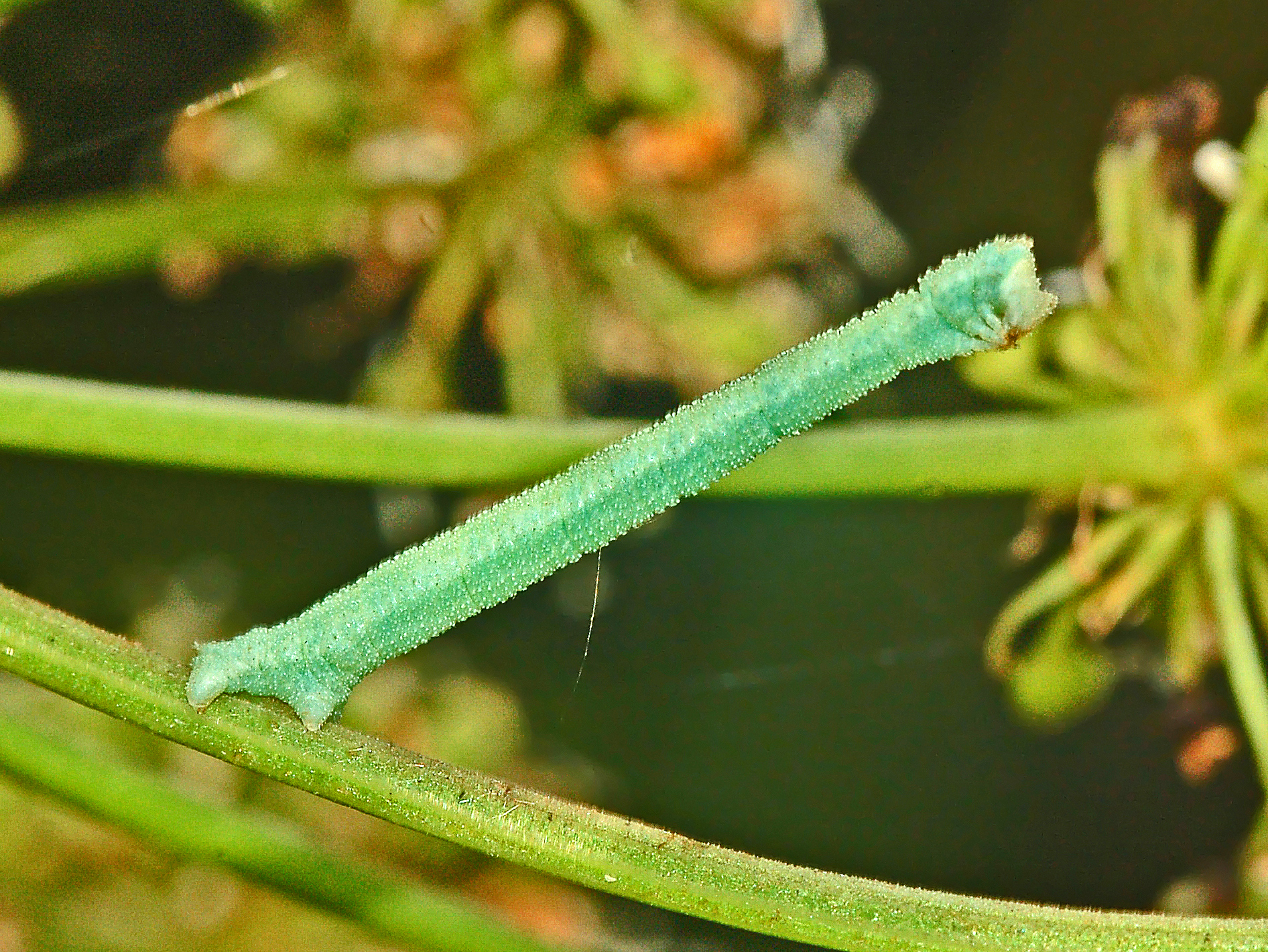
Caterpillar of Phaiogramma etruscaria

== Distribution ==
It is found from the Mediterranean Sea area of Europe to central Asia. Records include Russia, Italy, France, the Crimea, Turkmenistan, Kyrgyzstan and Kazakhstan.

== Habitat ==
This species inhabits warm scrubs and xerophilous hillsides.
