= Carnosol =

- Chemical structure of carnosol

Names
- IUPAC name 11,12-Dihydroxy-7β,20-epoxyabieta-8,11,13-trien-20-one
- Systematic IUPAC name (4aR,9S,10aS)-5,6-Dihydroxy-1,1-dimethyl-7-(propan-2-yl)-1,3,4,9,10,10a-hexahydro-2H-9,4a-(epoxymethano)phenanthren-12-one

Identifiers
CAS Number	5957-80-2
3D model (JSmol)	Interactive image
ChemSpider	390568
PubChem CID	442009
UNII	483O455CKD
CompTox Dashboard (EPA)	DTXSID80904451
- InChI: InChI=1S/C20H26O4/c1-10(2)11-8-12-13-9-14-19(3,4)6-5-7-20(14,18(23)24-13)15(12)17(22)16(11)21/h8,10,13-14,21-22H,5-7,9H2,1-4H3/t13-,14-,20+/m0/s1 Key: XUSYGBPHQBWGAD-PJSUUKDQSA-N; InChI=1/C20H26O4/c1-10(2)11-8-12-13-9-14-19(3,4)6-5-7-20(14,18(23)24-13)15(12)17(22)16(11)21/h8,10,13-14,21-22H,5-7,9H2,1-4H3/t13-,14-,20+/m0/s1 Key: XUSYGBPHQBWGAD-PJSUUKDQBN
- SMILES: CC(C)C1=CC2=C(C(=C1O)O)[C@@]34CCCC([C@@H]3C[C@@H]2OC4=O)(C)C

Properties
Chemical formula	C_{20}H_{26}O_{4}
Molar mass	330.424 g·mol^{−1}
- Except where otherwise noted, data are given for materials in their standard state (at 25 °C [77 °F], 100 kPa). Infobox references

Carnosol is a phenolic diterpene found in the herbs rosemary (Rosmarinus officinalis) and Mountain desert sage (Salvia pachyphylla).

It has been studied in-vitro for anti-cancer effects in various cancer cell types.

== See also ==
- Carnosic acid
- List of phytochemicals in food
