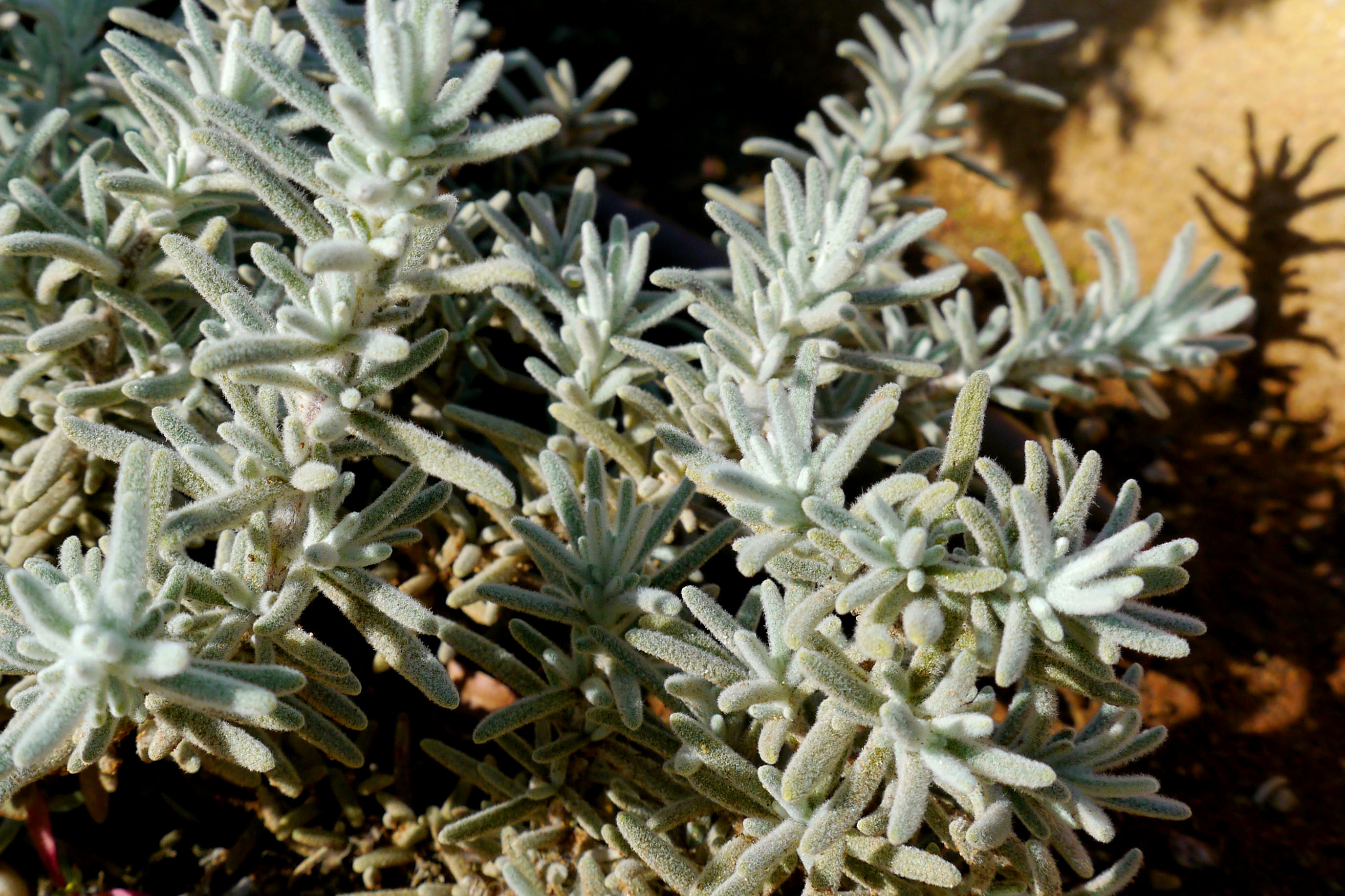

Scientific classification
- Kingdom: Plantae
- Clade: Tracheophytes
- Clade: Angiosperms
- Clade: Eudicots
- Clade: Asterids
- Order: Lamiales
- Family: Lamiaceae
- Genus: Salvia
- Species: S. granatensis

Binomial name
- Salvia granatensis B.T.Drew

Synonyms
- Rosmarinus tomentosus Hub.-Mor. & Maire

= Salvia granatensis =

Species of flowering plant

Salvia granatensis (cliff rosemary) is a species of Salvia (previously Rosmarinus tomentosus, until that genus was merged into Salvia) from southern Spain.
