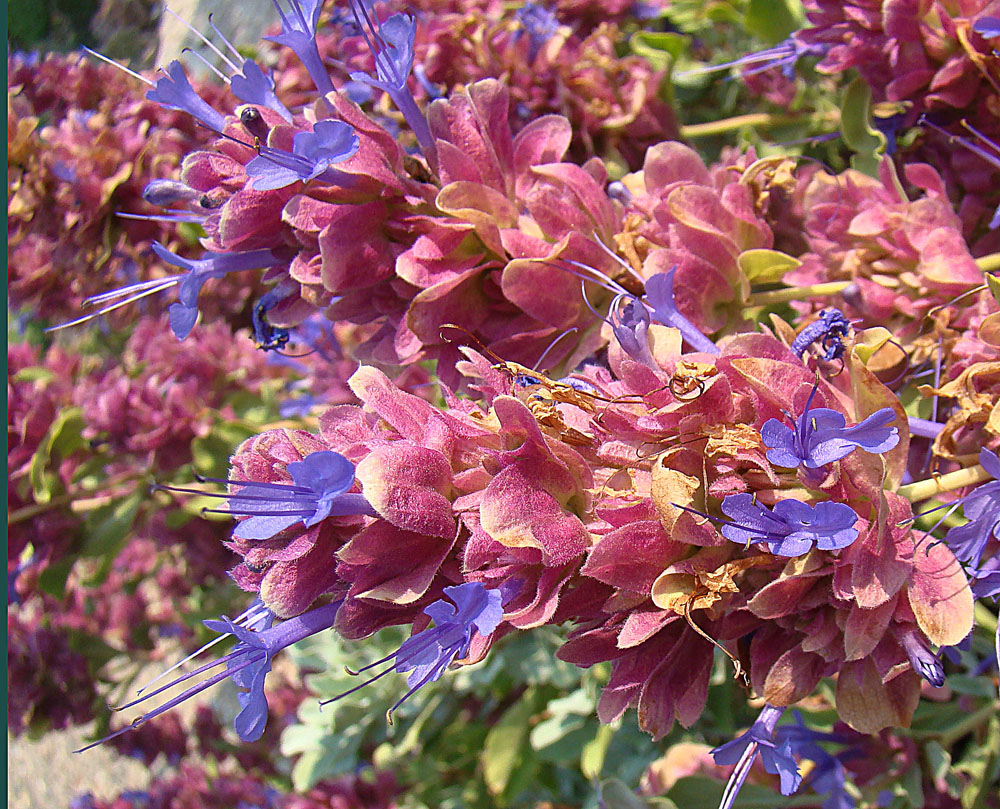

Scientific classification
- Kingdom: Plantae
- Clade: Tracheophytes
- Clade: Angiosperms
- Clade: Eudicots
- Clade: Asterids
- Order: Lamiales
- Family: Lamiaceae
- Genus: Salvia
- Species: S. pachyphylla

Binomial name
- Salvia pachyphylla Epling ex Munz

= Salvia pachyphylla =

Species of shrub

Salvia pachyphylla (the rose sage, blue sage, or mountain desert sage) is a perennial shrub native to California, Nevada, and Arizona. In California, it grows between 5,000 to 10,000 ft (1,500 to 3,000 m) elevation on dry rocky slopes, blooming from July to September. It reaches 1 to 2 ft (0.30 to 0.61 m) high, with blue-violet flowers, rarely rose, growing in dense clusters.

Chemical structure of pachyphyllone

In the course of a study of the chemical composition of the flora used in Latin American traditional medicine, Ivan C. Guerrero and coworkers have performed phytochemical studies of extracts of the aerial parts from Salvia pachyphylla and Salvia clevelandii . The major secondary metabolites were isolated from these species and the in vitro cytotoxic effects against five human cancer cells were reported for eight of the compounds obtained: carnosol, rosmanol, 20-deoxocarnosol, carnosic acid, isorosmanol, 7-methoxyrosmanol, 5,6-didehydro-O-methylsugiol, 8β-hydroxy-9(11),13-abietadien-12-one, 11,12-dioxoabieta-8,13-diene, and 11,12-dihydroxy-20-norabieta-5(10),8,11,13-tetraen-1-one, and pachyphyllone.
