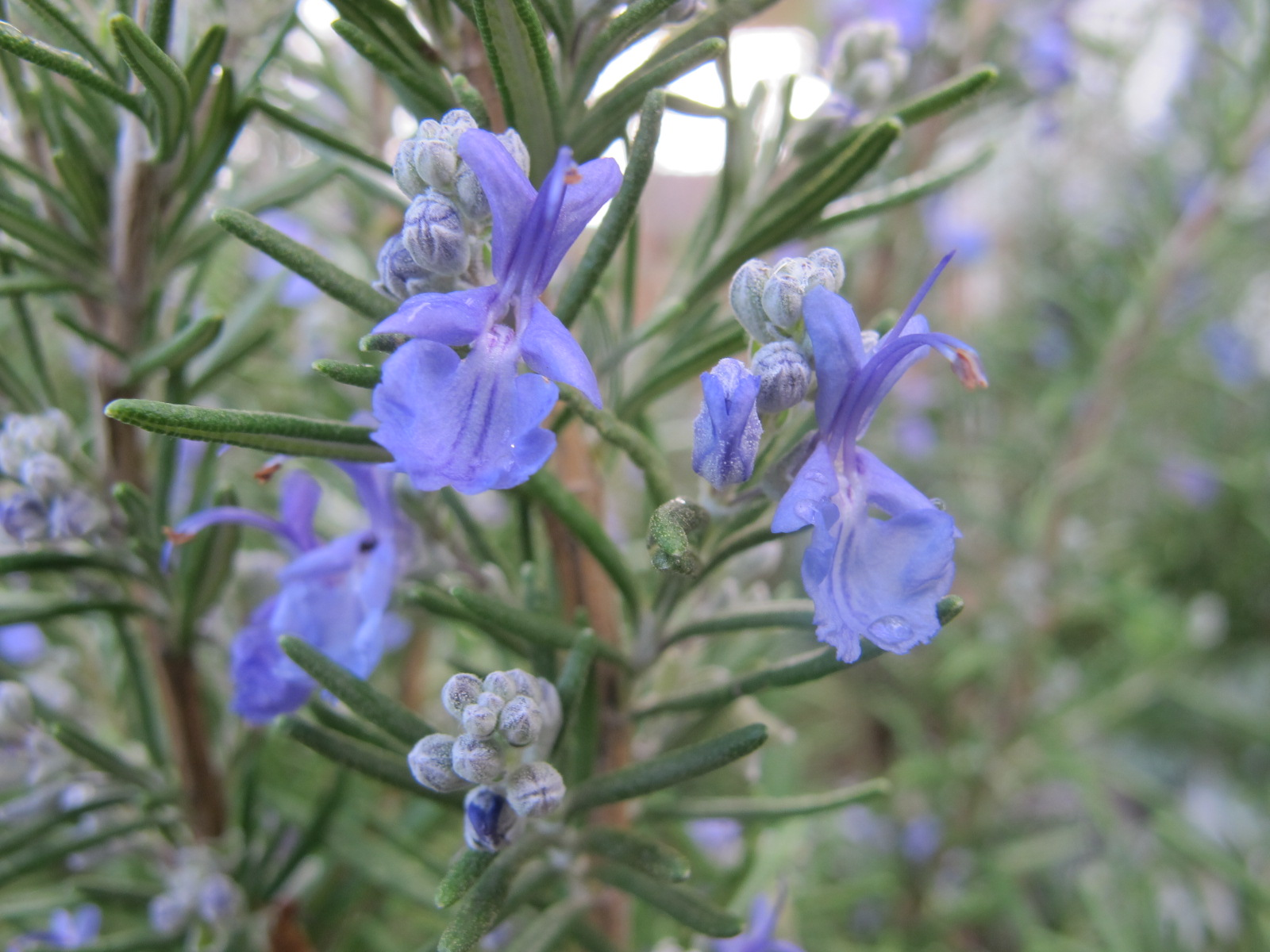

Scientific classification
- Kingdom: Plantae
- Clade: Tracheophytes
- Clade: Angiosperms
- Clade: Eudicots
- Clade: Asterids
- Order: Lamiales
- Family: Lamiaceae
- Genus: Salvia
- Species: S. rosmarinus

Binomial name
- Salvia rosmarinus Spenn.

Synonyms
- Rosmarinus angustifolius Mill.; Rosmarinus communis Noronha; Rosmarinus flexuosus Jord. & Fourr.; Rosmarinus latifolius Mill.; Rosmarinus ligusticus Gand.; Rosmarinus officinalis L.; Rosmarinus palaui (O.Bolòs & Molin.) Rivas Mart. & M.J.Costa; Rosmarinus prostratus Mazziari; Rosmarinus rigidus Jord. & Fourr.; Rosmarinus tenuifolius Jord. & Fourr.; Salvia fasciculata Fernald

= Rosemary =

Species of plant

Salvia rosmarinus, synonym Rosmarinus officinalis, commonly known as rosemary, is a shrub with fragrant, evergreen, needle-like leaves and purple or sometimes white, pink, or blue flowers. It is a member of the mint family, Lamiaceae. The species is native to the Mediterranean region. It has numerous cultivars, and its leaves are commonly used as a flavoring.

== Description ==
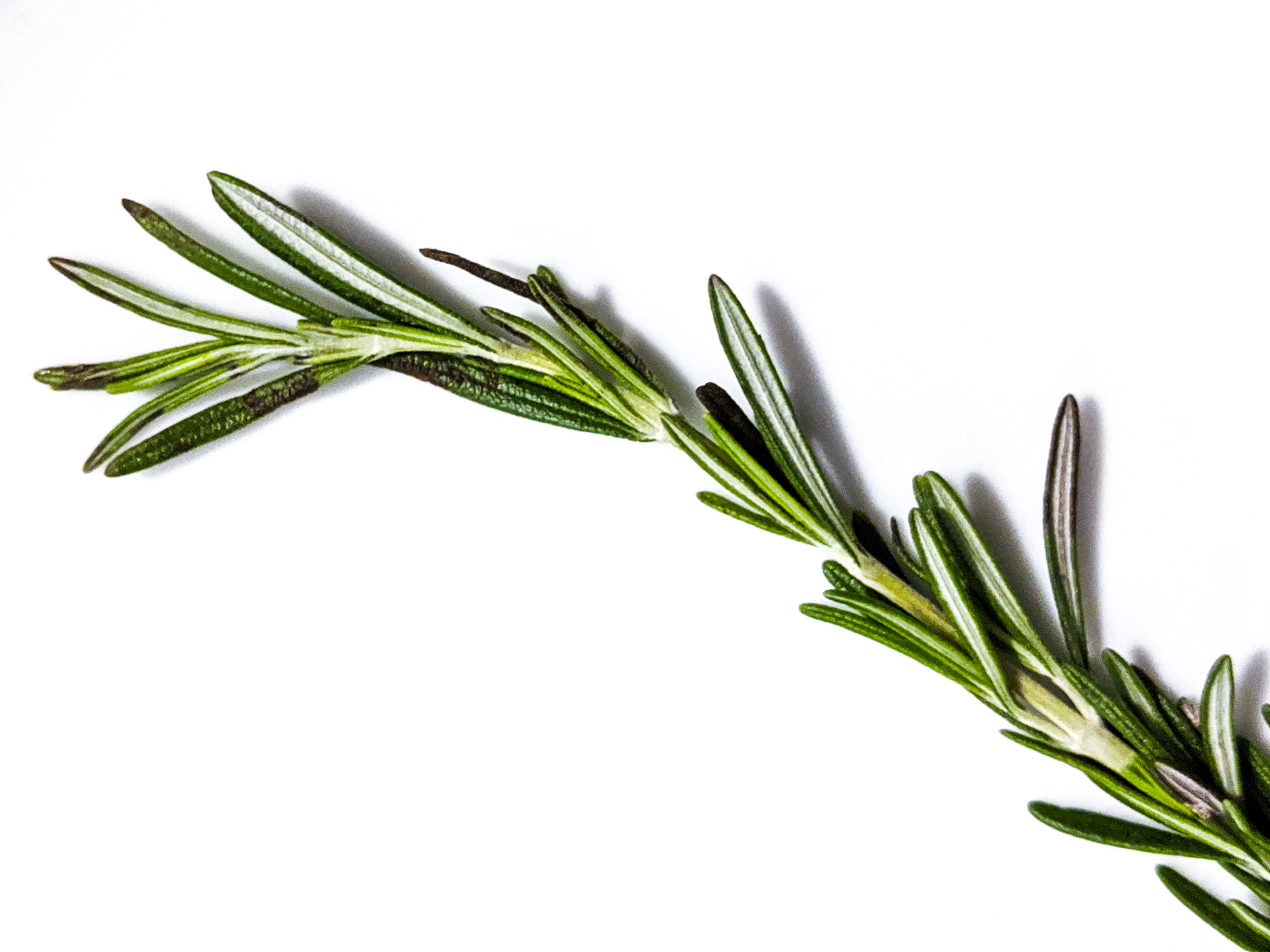
Rosemary leaves

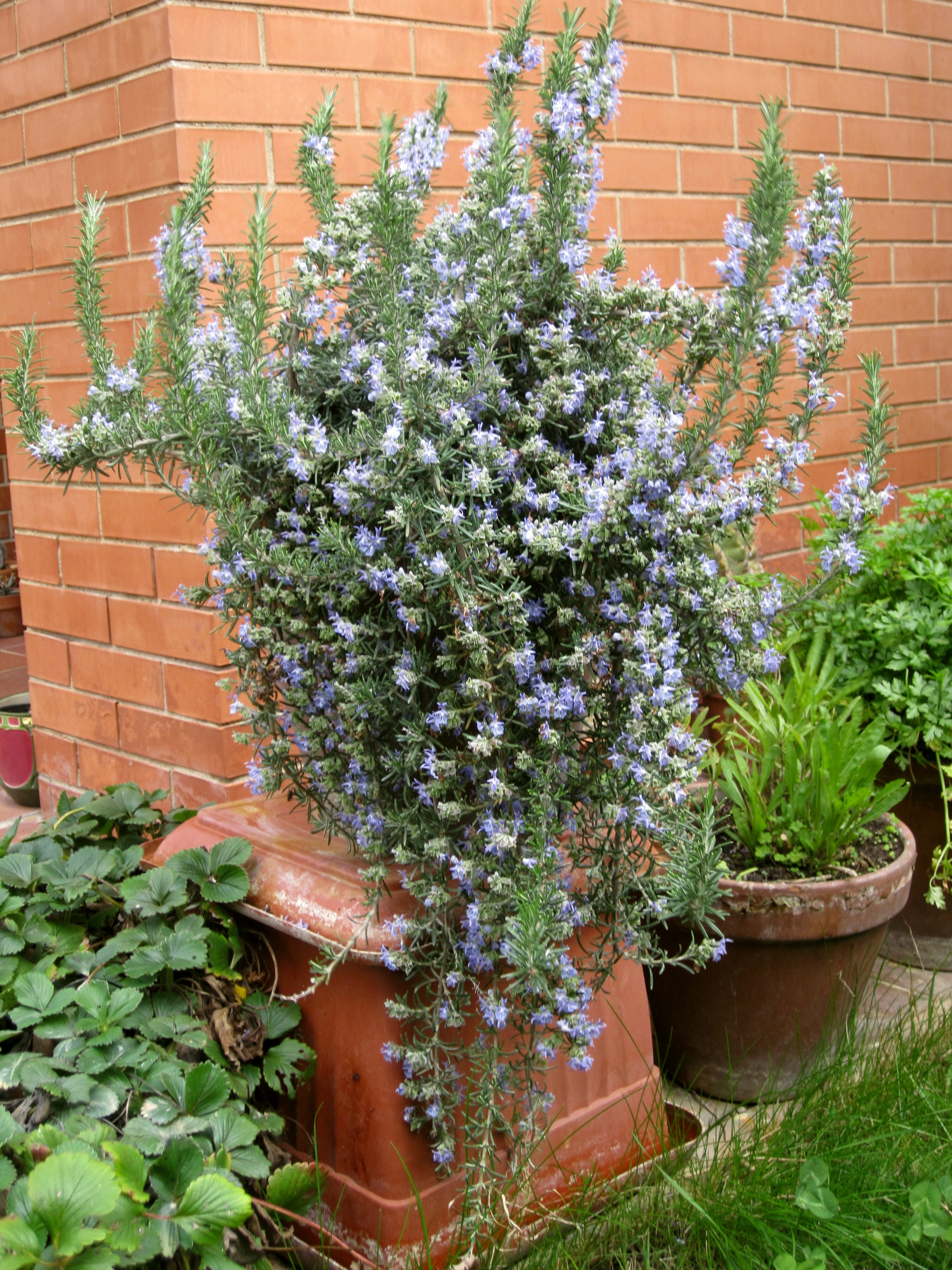
S. rosmarinus 'Prostratus'

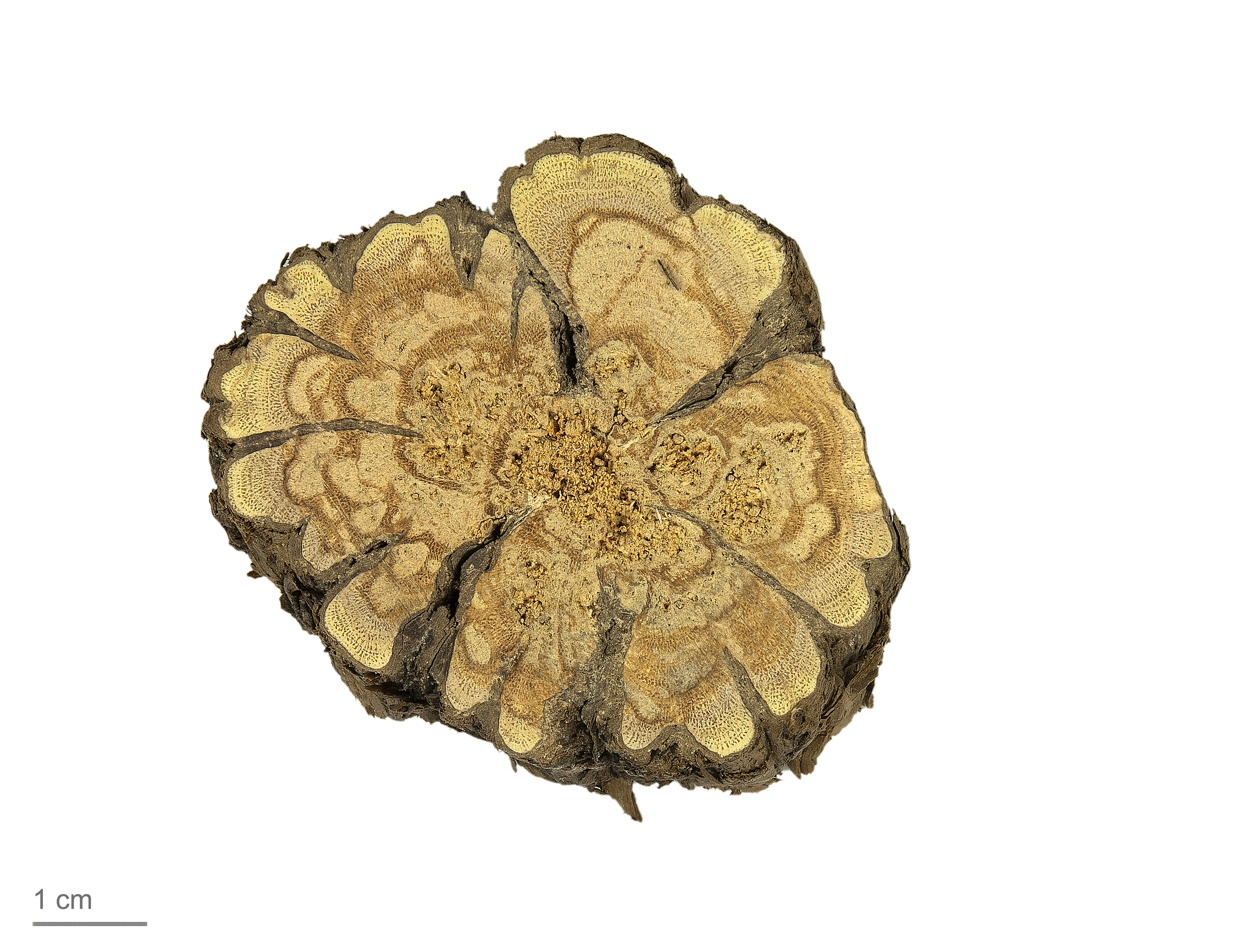
Cross-section of woody stem of Salvia rosmarinus (MHNT)

Rosemary has a fibrous root system. It forms an aromatic evergreen shrub with leaves similar to Tsuga needles. Forms range from upright to trailing; the upright forms can reach between 1.2–1.8 meters (4–6 ft) tall. The leaves are evergreen, 2–4 cm (3/4–1 1/2 in) long and 2–5 mm (1/16–3/16 in) broad, green above, and white below, with dense, short, woolly hair.

The plant flowers in spring and summer in temperate climates but may be in constant bloom in warm climates; flowers are white, pink, purple, or deep blue. The branches are dotted with groups of 2 to 3 flowers down their length. Rosemary also tends to flower outside its normal flowering season; it has been known to flower as late as early December and as early as mid-February (in the Northern Hemisphere). The plant can live as long as 35 years.

=== Similar species ===
Salvia jordanii (formerly Rosmarinus eriocalyx) is a closely related species native to Iberia and the Maghreb of Africa.

== Taxonomy ==
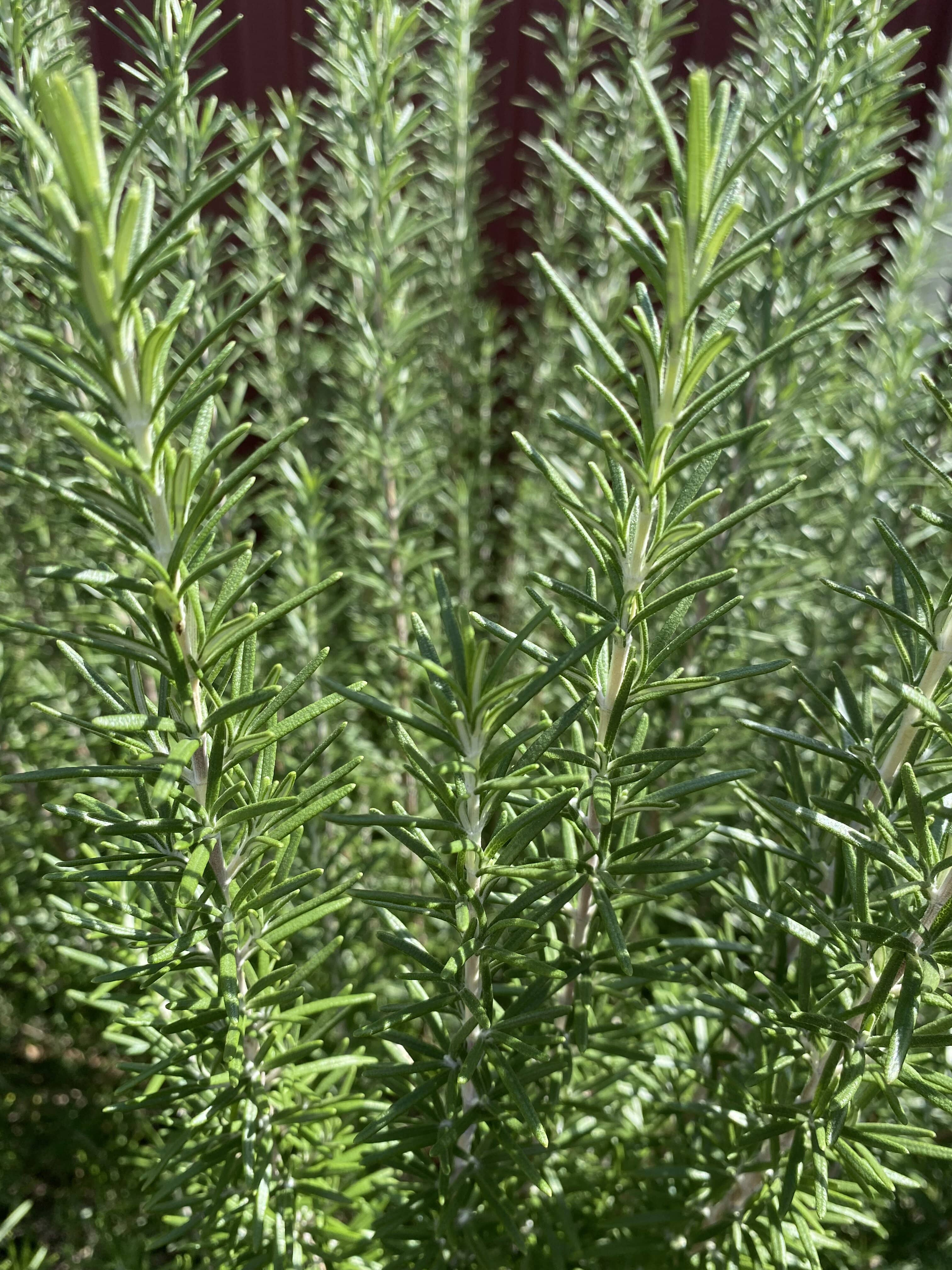
Rosemary plant

The species was first described by Carl Linnaeus in 1753 as Rosmarinus officinalis. In 2017, on the basis of molecular phylogenetic evidence, rosemary was reclassified into Salvia, reviving a name first published in 1835 by Fridolin Karl Leopold Spenner, who had transferred the species to the genus Salvia. The epithet officinalis at that time could not be used because the name Salvia officinalis had already been published, so Spenner used the combination Salvia rosmarinus as a replacement name for the replaced synonym Rosmarinus officinalis. Rosmarinus is cited by Linnaeus in his 1753 work Species Plantarum as from an earlier work by Gaspard Bauhin: Πιναξ Theatri Botanici, whose second edition was published in 1671.

=== Etymology ===
Elizabeth Kent noted in her Flora Domestica (1823), "The botanical name of this plant is compounded of two Latin words [ros marinus], signifying sea-dew; and indeed rosemary thrives best by the sea." The earliest usage in the classical era of the Latin word orthographically is Columella. (Note: The suggestion by the American Herbal Products Association of Virgil Georgics 2.213 is the word roremque LSJ provides "Hor. O. 3, 23, 16" as an indication of an earlier source but the usage is instead "marino rore")

== Distribution and habitat ==
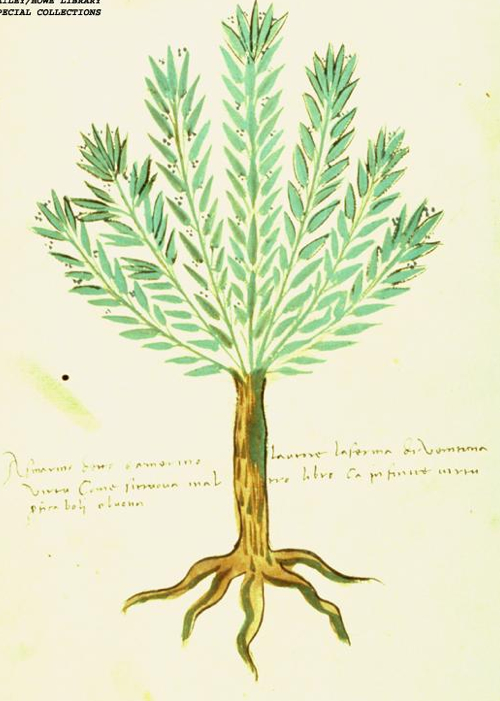
Illustration from an Italian herbal, circa 1500

It is native to the Mediterranean region, as well as Portugal and northwestern Spain. The herb was naturalized in China as early as 220 CE, during the late Han dynasty. Rosemary came to England at an unknown date, though it is likely that the Romans brought it when they invaded Britain in 43 CE. Even so, there are no viable records containing rosemary in Britain until the 8th century. This mention was in a document which was later credited to Charlemagne, who promoted the general usage of herbs and ordered rosemary specifically to be grown in monastic gardens and farms.

There are no records of rosemary being properly naturalized in Britain until 1338, when cuttings were sent to Queen Philippa by her mother, Countess Joan of Hainault. It was then planted in the garden of the old palace of Westminster. Since then, rosemary can be found in most English herbal texts. Rosemary arrived in the Americas with early European settlers in the beginning of the 17th century and was spread to South America and distributed globally.

It is reasonably hardy in cool climates. Special cultivars like 'Arp' can withstand winter temperatures down to about −20 °C (−4 °F). It can withstand droughts, surviving a severe lack of water for lengthy periods. It is considered a potentially invasive species. Its seeds are often difficult to start, with a low germination rate.

== Cultivation ==
Since it is attractive and drought-tolerant, rosemary is used as an ornamental plant in gardens and for xeriscape landscaping, especially in regions of Mediterranean climate. It is considered easy to grow and pest-resistant. Rosemary can grow quite large and retain attractiveness for many years, can be pruned into formal shapes and low hedges, and has been used for topiary. It is easily grown in pots. The groundcover cultivars spread widely, with a dense and durable texture.

In order to harvest from the plant, the bush should be matured 2–3 years to ensure it is large enough to withstand it. The amount harvested should not exceed 20% of the growth in order to preserve the plant.

=== Cultivars ===
Numerous cultivars have been selected for garden use.

- 'Albus' – white flowers
- 'Arp' – popular upright-growing variety with light green leaves originally cultivated by Madalene Hill of Arp, Texas; lemon-scented and cold-hardy to 10° Fahrenheit
- 'Aureus' – leaves speckled yellow
- 'Benenden Blue' – leaves narrow, dark green
- 'Blue Boy' – dwarf, prostrate variety with small leaves
- 'Blue Rain' – pink flowers
- 'Golden Rain' – leaves green, with yellow streaks
- 'Gold Dust' – dark green leaves, with golden streaks but stronger than 'Golden Rain'
- 'Gorizia' – an upright-growing cultivar with much larger leaves than other varieties
- 'Haifa' – low and small, white flowers
- 'Irene' – low and lax, trailing, intense blue flowers
- 'Lockwood de Forest' – procumbent selection from 'Tuscan Blue'
- 'Ken Taylor' – shrubby
- 'Majorca Pink'/'Majorca' – pink or light purple flowers, upright grower with long branches that twist before cascading around the plant, cold-hardy to 15° Fahrenheit
- 'Miss Jessopp's Upright' – distinctive tall fastigiate form, with wider leaves.
- 'Pinkie' – pink flowers
- 'Prostratus' – lower groundcover
- 'Pyramidalis' (or 'Erectus') – fastigiate form, pale blue flowers
- 'Remembrance' (or 'Gallipoli') – taken from the Gallipoli Peninsula
- 'Roseus'/'Roseus-Cozart' – pink flowers (see 'Majorca Pink' cultivar)
- 'Salem' – pale blue flowers, cold-hardy similar to 'Arp'
- 'Severn Sea' – spreading, low-growing, with arching branches, flowers deep violet
- 'Sudbury Blue' – blue flowers
- 'Tuscan Blue' – traditional robust upright form, a fast growing variety, cold hardy to 15° Fahrenheit
- 'Wilma's Gold' – yellow leaves

The following cultivars have gained the Royal Horticultural Society's Award of Garden Merit:

- 'Benenden Blue'
- 'Miss Jessopp's Upright'
- 'Severn Sea'
- 'Sissinghurst Blue'

== Uses ==
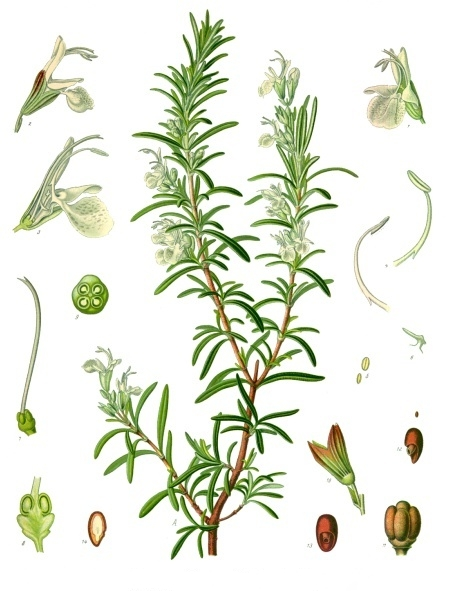
Illustration from Köhler's Medicinal Plants

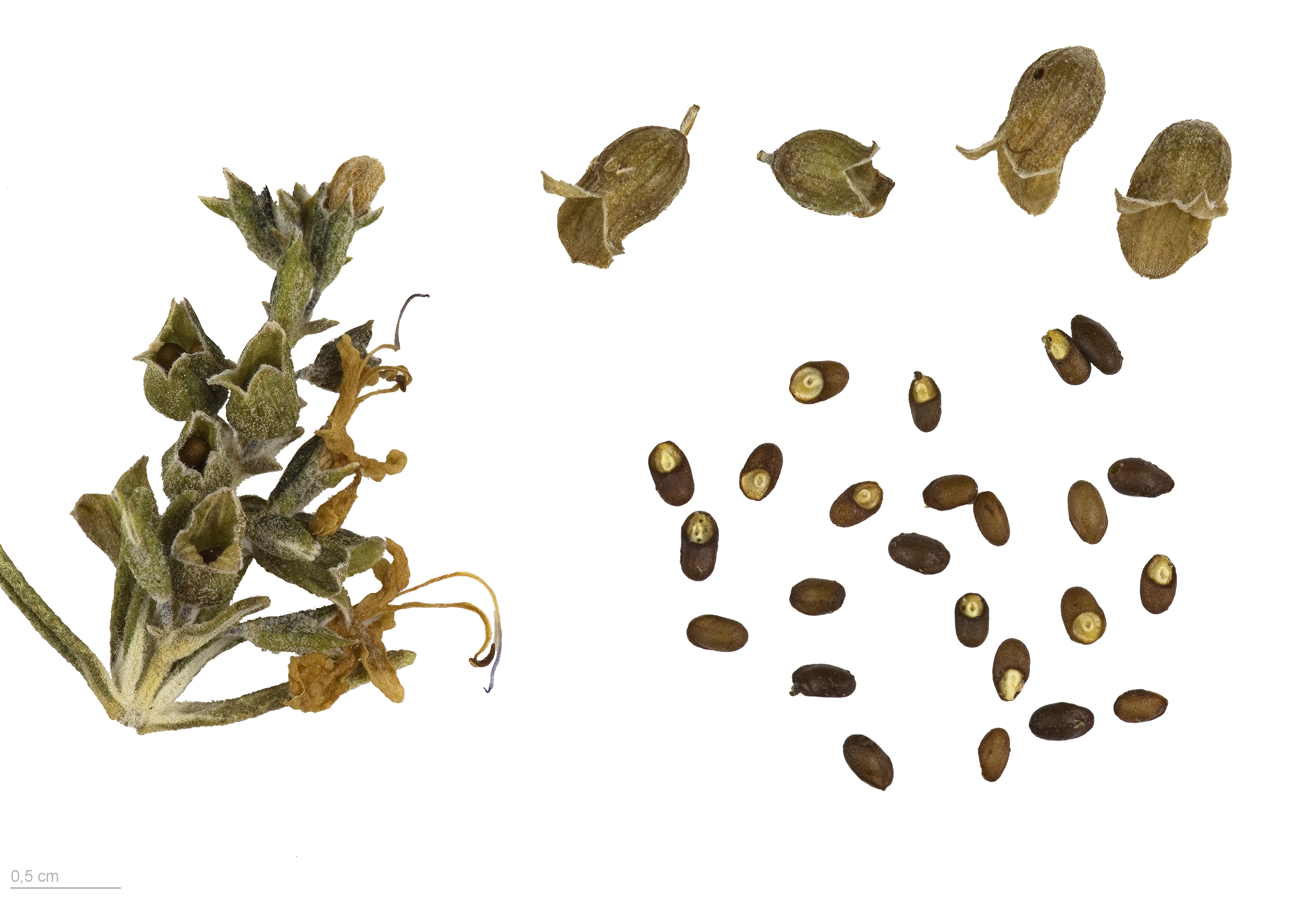
Seeds (MHNT)

=== Culinary ===
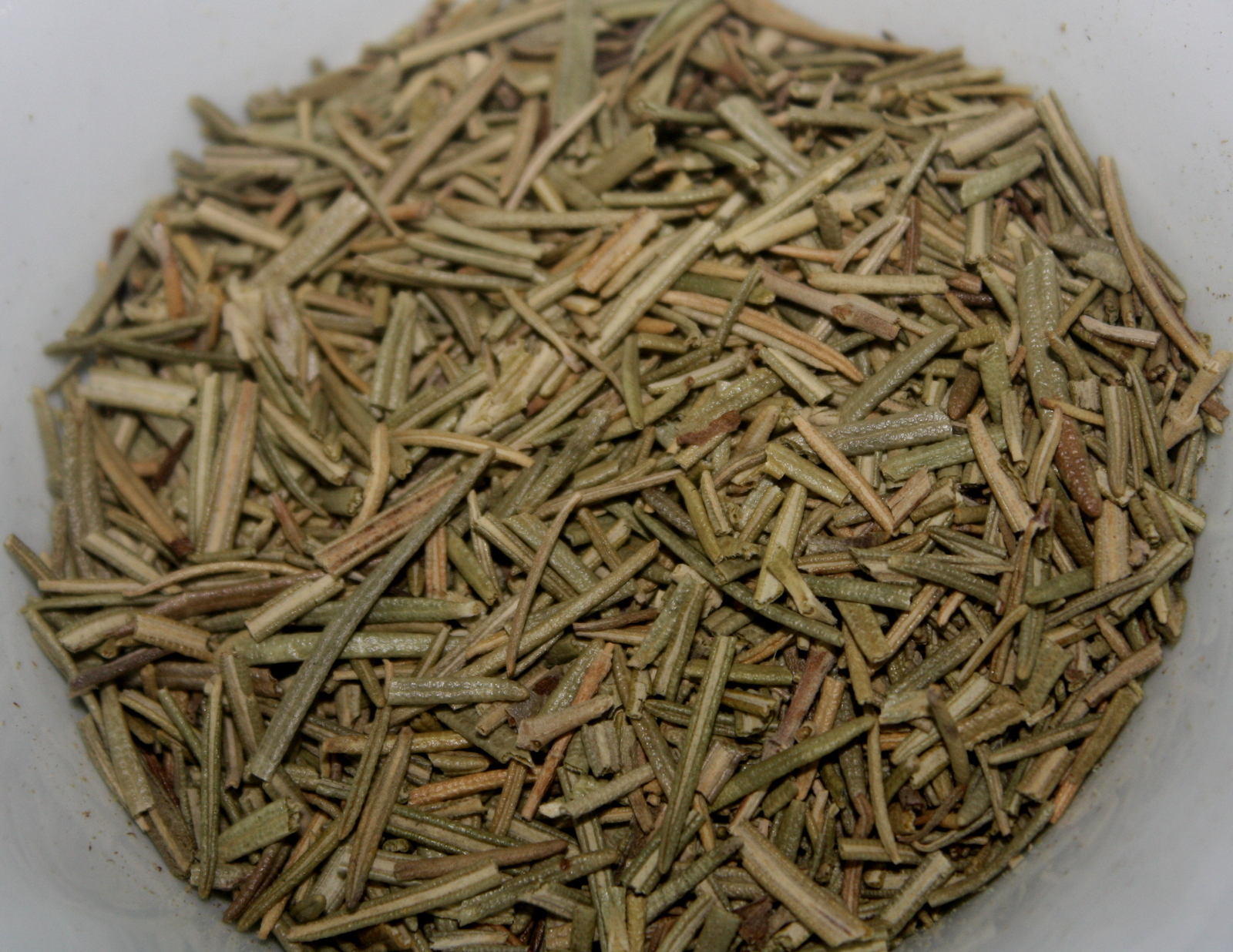
Dried leaves

Rosemary leaves are used as a flavoring in foods, such as stews, stuffing, roasted meats, and marinades. Fresh or dried leaves are used in traditional Mediterranean cuisine, having an aroma of pine which complements many cooked foods. Herbal tea can be made from the leaves. In some cooking, the woody stem, stripped of its leaves, is used as a skewer.

Rosemary extract, specifically the type mainly consisting of carnosic acid and carnosol, is approved as a food preservative in several countries, having E number E392.

=== Fragrance ===
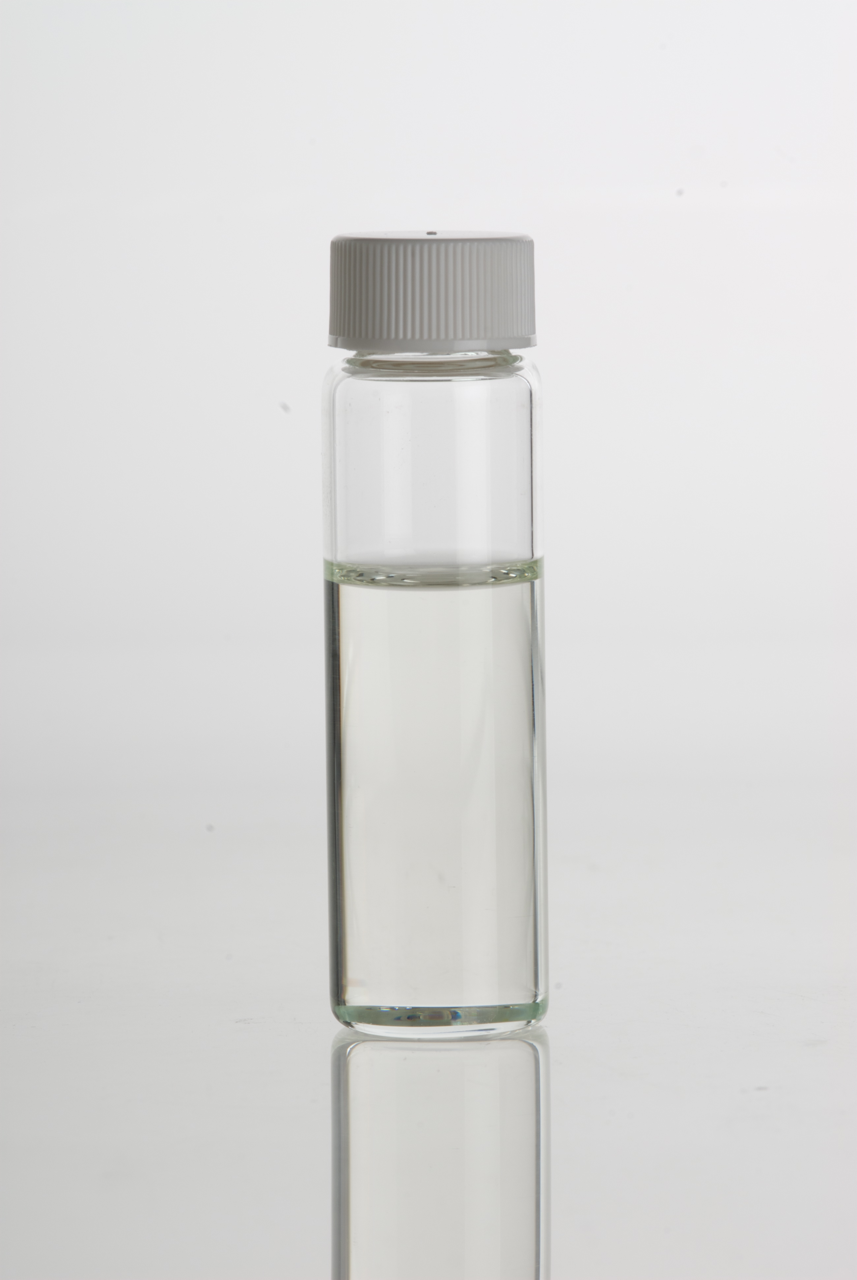
Essential oil

Hungary water, dating to the 14th century, was one of the first alcohol-based perfumes in Europe and is primarily made from distilled rosemary. Rosemary oil is used in perfumes, shampoos, cleaning products, and aromatherapy.

== Biochemistry ==
Rosemary essential oil contains about 150 phytochemicals, including rosmarinic acid, camphor, A-pinene, caffeic acid, ursolic acid, betulinic acid, carnosic acid, and carnosol. Rosemary essential oil contains 10–20% camphor.

== In culture ==
Rosemary was considered sacred to ancient Egyptians, Romans, and Greeks. It was written about by Pliny the Elder and Pedanius Dioscorides, an ancient Greek botanist. Dioscorides discusses the plant in De materia medica, one of the most influential herbal books in history.

Several Shakespeare plays refer to the use of rosemary in burial or memorial rites. In Hamlet, Ophelia says, "There's rosemary, that's for remembrance. Pray you, love, remember." It likewise appears in Winter's Tale where Perdita talks about "Rosemary and Rue". In Romeo and Juliet, Friar Laurence admonishes the Capulet household to "Dry up your tears, and stick your rosemary On this fair corse, and, as the custom is, And in her best array, bear her to church, For though fond nature bids us all lament, Yet nature’s tears are reason’s merriment."

It is also said that "In the language of flowers it means 'fidelity in love.'"

The plant has been used as a symbol for remembrance during war commemorations and funerals in Europe and Australia. Mourners toss it into graves as a symbol of remembrance for the dead. In Australia, sprigs of rosemary are worn on ANZAC Day and sometimes Remembrance Day to signify remembrance; the herb grows wild on the Gallipoli Peninsula, where many Australians died during World War I.

Rosemary is used in Danube Swabian culture for christenings, weddings, burials and festivals; for example, an apple with a sprig of rosemary in it is used for Kirchweih celebrations.

== See also ==
- Four thieves vinegar
