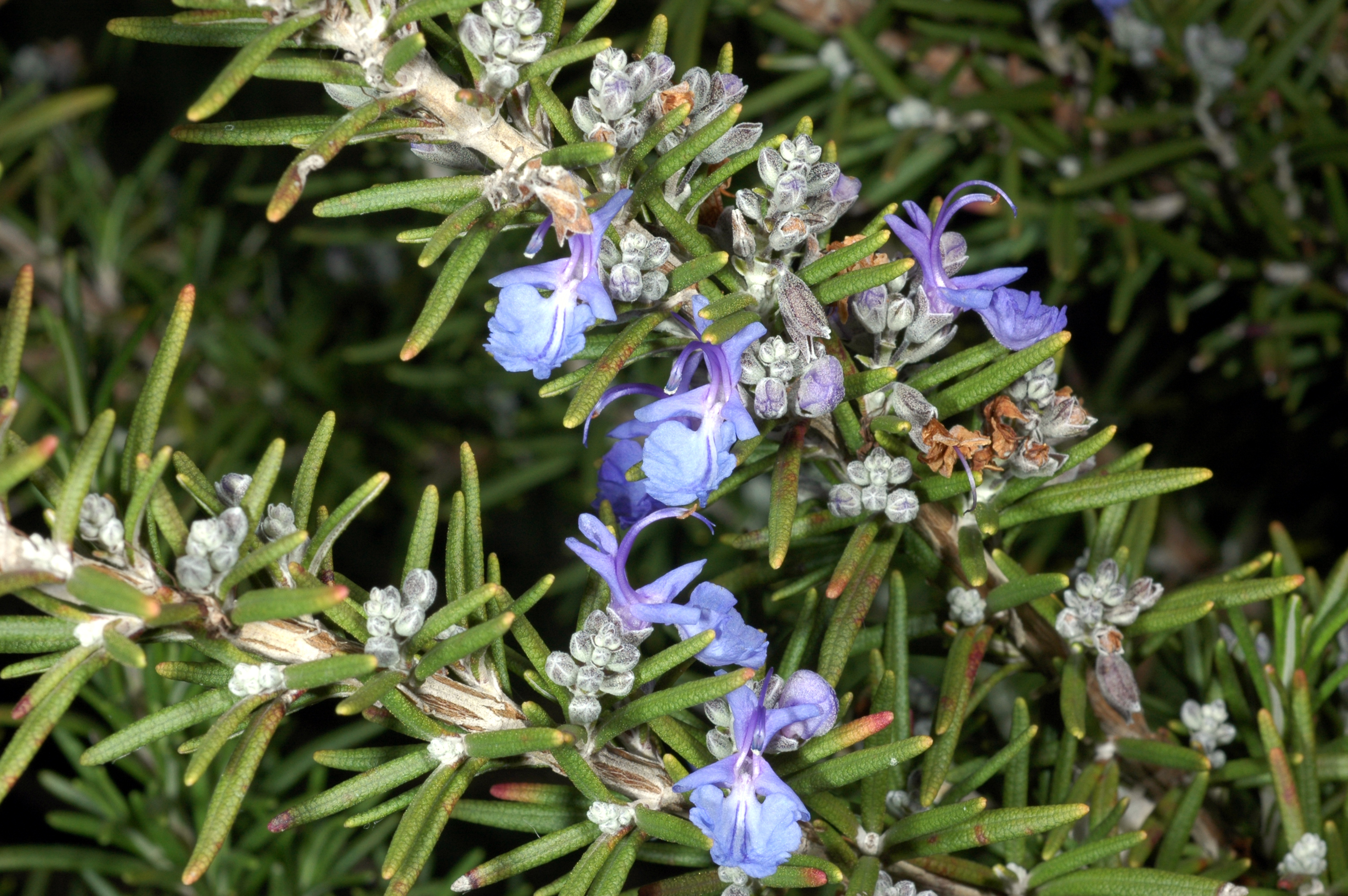

Scientific classification
- Kingdom: Plantae
- Clade: Tracheophytes
- Clade: Angiosperms
- Clade: Eudicots
- Clade: Asterids
- Order: Lamiales
- Family: Lamiaceae
- Tribe: Mentheae
- Genus: Salvia
- Clade: Rosmarinus; L.

= Rosmarinus =

Clade of herbs

Rosmarinus (/ˌrɒsməˈraɪnəs/ ROSS-mə-RY-nəs) is a small taxonomic clade of woody, perennial herbs with fragrant evergreen needle-like leaves in the family Lamiaceae, native to the Mediterranean Basin.

In 2017 the species in the genus Rosmarinus were moved into the large genus Salvia based on taxonomic evidence. Thus Rosmarinus is no longer a genus, but still a monophyletic clade of species within Salvia.

== Description ==
Salvia rosmarinus (rosemary), widespread in the Mediterranean region, and Salvia jordanii (formerly Rosmarinus eriocalyx), native to northwest Africa and southern Spain have long been widely recognized. Salvia granatensis (formerly Rosmarinus tomentosus) was first recognized as a separate species in 1941. Rosmarinus palaui was first described as a species in 2002, although recognition of this species remains controversial. Recent research has indicated that while S. granatensis forms a monophyletic group, this group is nested within a paraphyletic S. jordanii.

Salvia jordanii differs from the well-known herb rosemary in its smaller leaves, only 5–15 mm (0.20–0.59 in) long and less than 2 mm (0.079 in) broad, and densely hairy flower stems. It also tends to be lower-growing, often under 25 cm (9.8 in) tall and prostrate, and never exceeding 1 m (3 ft 3 in) tall (S. rosmarinus can reach 1.5 m (4 ft 11 in), exceptionally 2 m (6 ft 7 in), tall).

Rosemary can be propagated from seed or cuttings in summer, and can be spread by carelessly discarding garden waste.

== Species ==
Species and nothospecies accepted by the Kew World Checklist

Image	Scientific name	Common name	Distribution
	Salvia jordanii Jord. & Fourr.	Algerian rosemary	Spain, Morocco, Algeria, Libya
	Salvia rosmarinus L.	Rosemary	Portugal, Spain, France, Italy, Greece, Albania, Bosnia and Herzegovina, Croatia, Montenegro, Morocco, Algeria, Libya, Tunisia, Egypt, Cyprus, Turkey; naturalized in Bulgaria, Crimea, Madeira islands, Canary Islands, Cape Verde, Bermuda, Texas, central Mexico
	Rosmarinus palaui (O.Bolòs & Molin.) Rivas Mart. & M.J.Costa		
	Salvia granatensis Hub.-Mor. & Maire	cliff rosemary	southern Spain

== Natural hybrids ==
Image	Scientific name	Parents	Distribution	
	Salvia × lavandulacea de Noé	(S. jordanii × S. rosmarinus)	Andalusian rosemary	Spain, Morocco, Algeria
	Salvia × mendizabalii Sagredo ex Rosua	(S. rosmarinus × S. granatensis)	Granadan rosemary	Granada region of Spain
