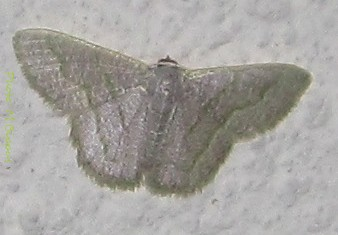

Scientific classification
- Kingdom: Animalia
- Phylum: Arthropoda
- Class: Insecta
- Order: Lepidoptera
- Family: Geometridae
- Genus: Phaiogramma
- Species: P. stibolepida

Binomial name
- Phaiogramma stibolepida (Butler, 1879)

Synonyms
- Comibaena stibolepida Butler, 1879; Nemoria pallidularia Mabille, 1880

= Phaiogramma stibolepida =

Species of moth

Phaiogramma stibolepida is a species of moth of the family Geometridae erected by Arthur Gardiner Butler in 1879. It is found in eastern and southern Africa and on Madagascar.

The larvae feed on Malvaceae species and their wingspan is around 20 mm.

The original description of Butler of this species is:

Comibaena stibolepida, n.sp.

Wings snow-white, densely mottled with dull bluish-green; a slightly arched testaceous stripe across the basal area, and an undulated discal stripe of the same colour; body whitish testaceous; wings below white, primaries with testaceous costal border; body white, legs red-brown above. Expanse of wings: 11 lines

Allied to C. pieridoides
