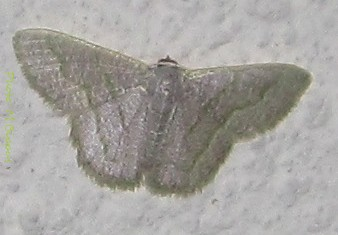
- Phaiogramma stibolepida

Scientific classification
- Kingdom: Animalia
- Phylum: Arthropoda
- Class: Insecta
- Order: Lepidoptera
- Family: Geometridae
- Genus: Phaiogramma von Gumppenberg, 1887

= Phaiogramma =

Genus of moths

Phaiogramma is a genus of moths in the family Geometridae erected by Carl Freiherr von Gumppenberg in 1887. Markku Savela gives this name as a synonym of Chlorissa Stephens, 1831.

== Species ==
Species include:

- Phaiogramma discessa (Walker, 1861)
- Phaiogramma etruscaria (Zeller, 1849)
- Phaiogramma faustinata (Milliere, 1868)
  - P. faustinata hintzi (Strand, 1915)
  - P. faustinata vermiculata (Warren, 1897)
- Phaiogramma stibolepida (Butler, 1879)
