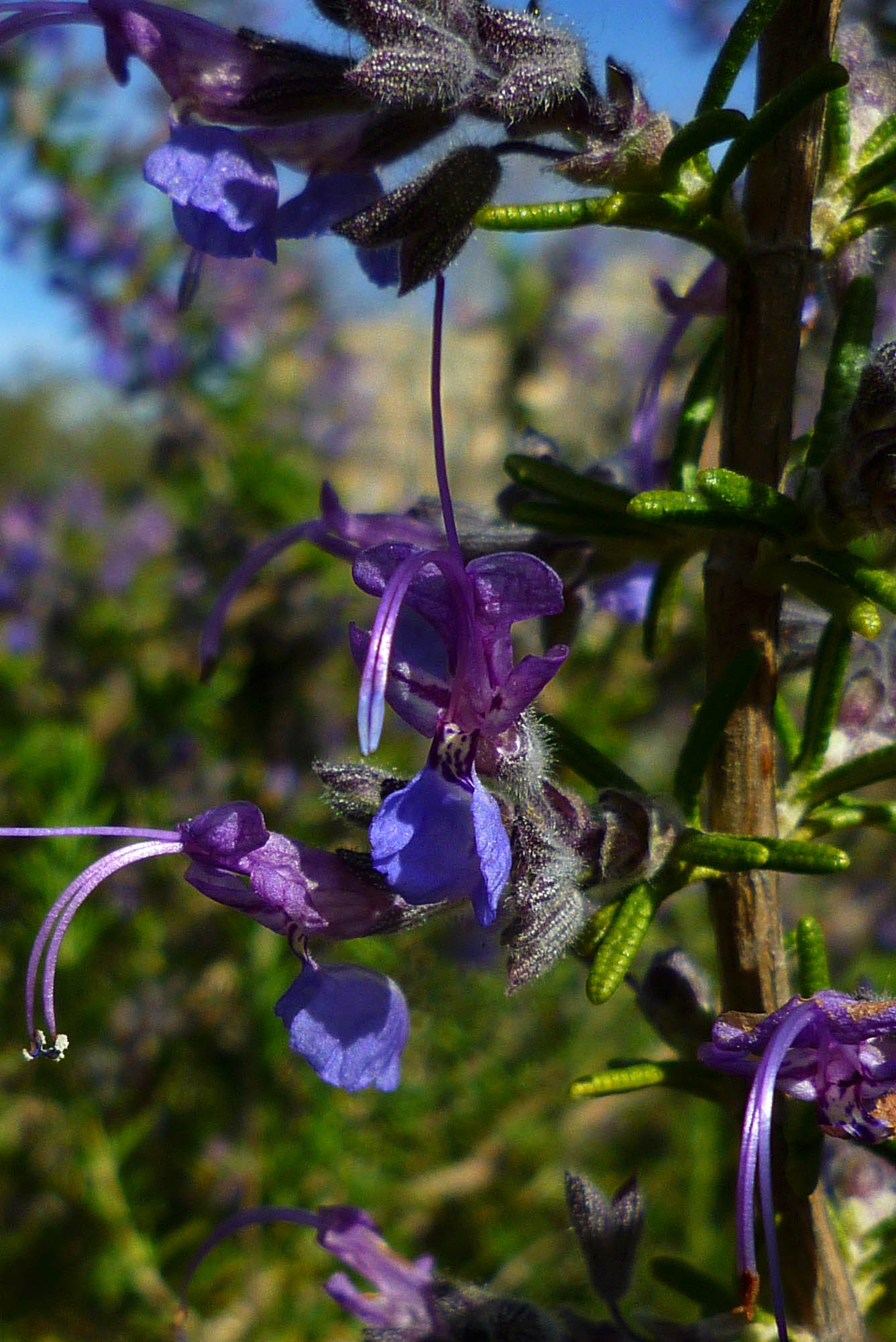

Scientific classification
- Kingdom: Plantae
- Clade: Tracheophytes
- Clade: Angiosperms
- Clade: Eudicots
- Clade: Asterids
- Order: Lamiales
- Family: Lamiaceae
- Genus: Salvia
- Species: S. jordanii

Binomial name
- Salvia jordanii J.B.Walker

Synonyms
- Rosmarinus eriocalyx Jord. & Fourr. 1866

= Salvia jordanii =

Species of flowering plant

Salvia jordanii (Algerian rosemary) is a species of Salvia from Spain, Morocco, Algeria, and Libya. It was formerly in a much smaller genus Rosmarinus, but was moved into Salvia based on DNA evidence.
