= Carnosic acid =

- Chemical structure of carnosic acid

Names
- IUPAC name 11,12-Dihydroxyabieta-8,11,13-trien-20-oic acid
- Systematic IUPAC name (4aR,10aS)-5,6-Dihydroxy-1,1-dimethyl-7-(propan-2-yl)-1,3,4,9,10,10a-hexahydrophenanthrene-4a(2H)-carboxylic acid
- Other names Salvin

Identifiers
CAS Number	3650-09-7
3D model (JSmol)	Interactive image
ChEBI	CHEBI:65585
ChEMBL	ChEMBL484853
ChemSpider	58635
ECHA InfoCard	100.110.784
PubChem CID	65126
UNII	LI791SXT24
CompTox Dashboard (EPA)	DTXSID20904450
- InChI: InChI=1S/C20H28O4/c1-11(2)13-10-12-6-7-14-19(3,4)8-5-9-20(14,18(23)24)15(12)17(22)16(13)21/h10-11,14,21-22H,5-9H2,1-4H3,(H,23,24)/t14-,20+/m0/s1 Key: QRYRORQUOLYVBU-VBKZILBWSA-N; InChI=1/C20H28O4/c1-11(2)13-10-12-6-7-14-19(3,4)8-5-9-20(14,18(23)24)15(12)17(22)16(13)21/h10-11,14,21-22H,5-9H2,1-4H3,(H,23,24)/t14-,20+/m0/s1 Key: QRYRORQUOLYVBU-VBKZILBWBB
- SMILES: CC(C)C1=C(C(=C2C(=C1)CCC3C2(CCCC3(C)C)C(=O)O)O)O

Properties
Chemical formula	C_{20}H_{28}O_{4}
Molar mass	332.440 g·mol^{−1}
Melting point	185 to 190 °C (365 to 374 °F; 458 to 463 K)
- Except where otherwise noted, data are given for materials in their standard state (at 25 °C [77 °F], 100 kPa). verify (what is ?) Infobox references

Carnosic acid is a natural benzenediol abietane diterpene found in rosemary (Salvia rosmarinus) and common sage (Salvia officinalis). Dried leaves of rosemary and sage contain 1.5 to 2.5% carnosic acid.

Carnosic acid and carnosol, a derivative of the acid, are used as antioxidant preservatives in food and nonfood products, where they're labelled as "extracts of rosemary" (E392).
