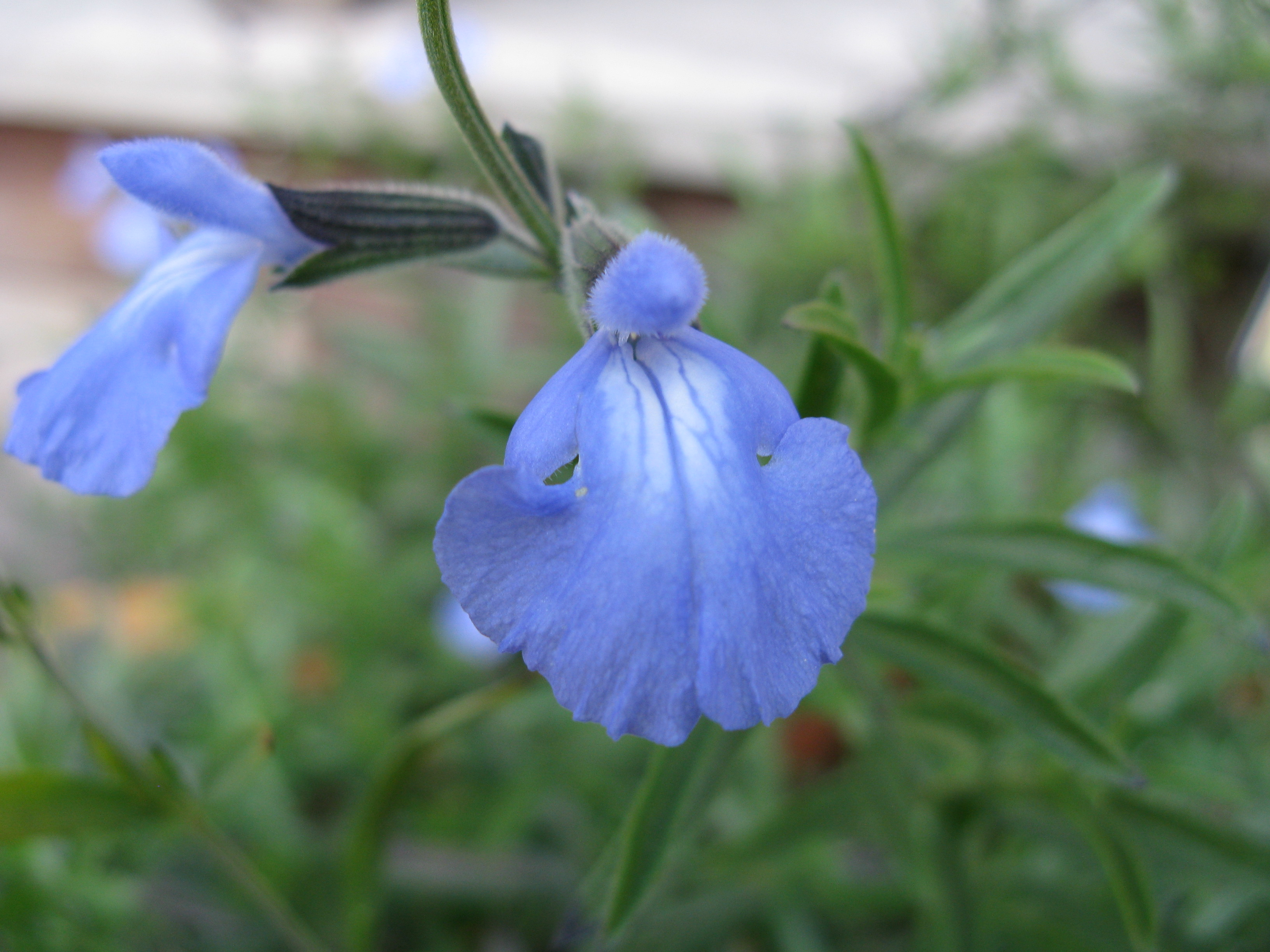

Conservation status
- Apparently Secure (NatureServe)

Scientific classification
- Kingdom: Plantae
- Clade: Tracheophytes
- Clade: Angiosperms
- Clade: Eudicots
- Clade: Asterids
- Order: Lamiales
- Family: Lamiaceae
- Genus: Salvia
- Species: S. azurea

Binomial name
- Salvia azurea Michx. ex Vahl

Synonyms
- List: Salvia acuminata Vent.; Salvia acuminatissima Steud.; Salvia angustifolia Michx.; Salvia azurea f. albiflora McGregor; Salvia azurea devilleana Jacob-Makoy; Salvia azurea var. elata (Poir.) Pursh; Salvia azurea var. grandiflora Benth.; Salvia azurea var. longifolia Trel.; Salvia azurea subsp. media Epling; Salvia azurea subsp. pitcheri (Torr. ex Benth.) Epling; Salvia azurea var. pitcheri (Torr. ex Benth.) E.Sheld.; Salvia azurea subsp. typica Epling; Salvia coriifolia Scheele; Salvia elata Poir.; Salvia elongata Torr.; Salvia mexicana Walter; Salvia pitcheri Torr. ex Benth.

= Salvia azurea =

Species of plant in the mint family

Salvia azurea, the blue sage or azure sage, is a herbaceous perennial in the genus Salvia that is native to Central and Eastern North America.

== Description ==
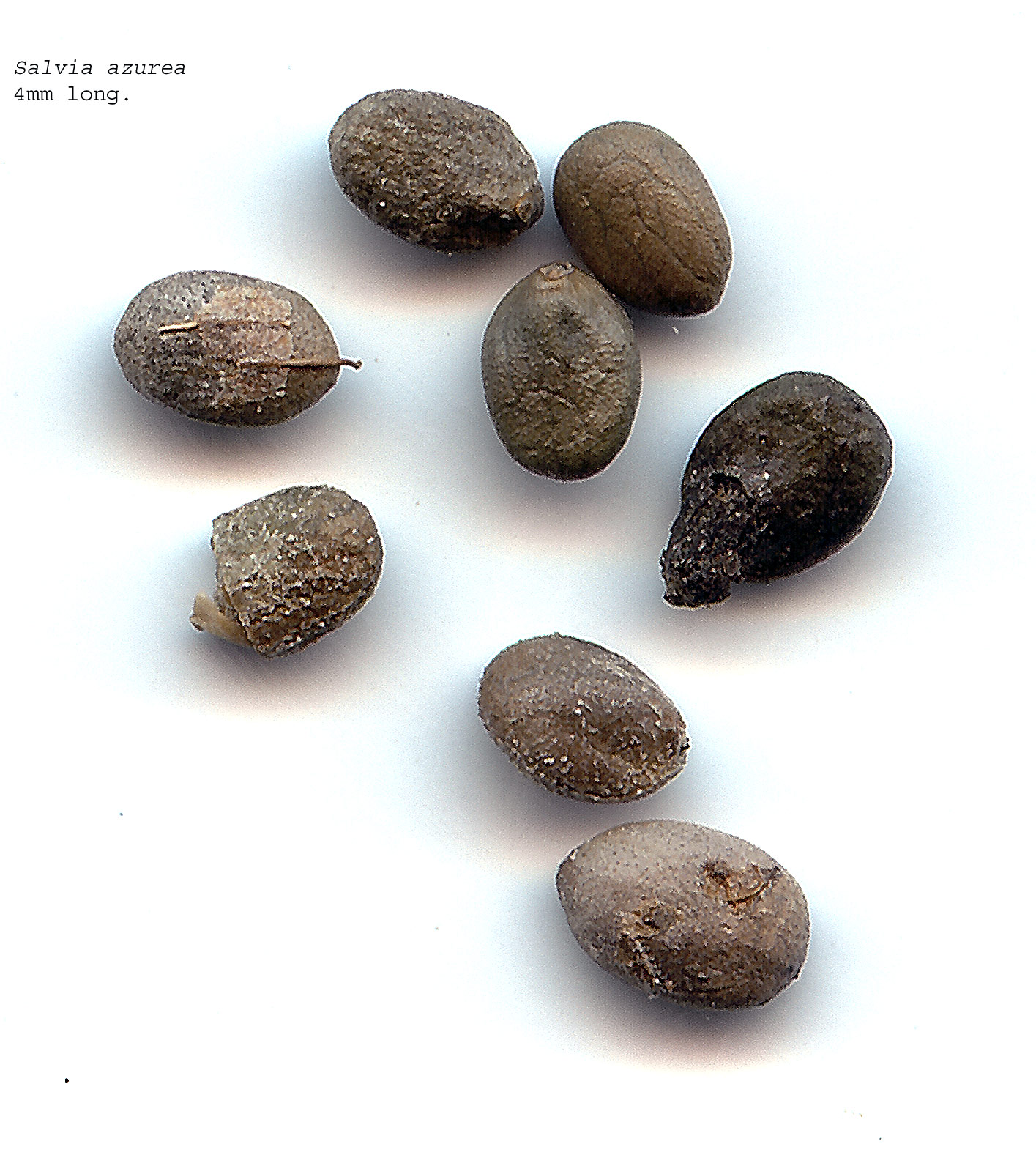
Seeds

Blue sage is a perennial plant with stems that reach 0.5 to 1.5 m (1 ft 8 in to 4 ft 11 in) when fully grown. Plants may have one stem or several, which grow from a thick caudex. The leaves are connected to their stems by petioles to 0.4 in (1.0 cm) long, narrow, pointed, smooth-edged to serrated, furry to smooth. The plant has no basal leaves.

The blue flowers (rarely white), nearly 1/4 to 1/2 in (6.4 to 12.7 mm) long, appear summer to autumn near the ends of their branched or unbranched spikes; their calyxes are tubular or bell-shaped and furry. Two varieties are known, Salvia azurea var. azurea (azure sage) and Salvia azurea var. grandiflora (pitcher sage).

The stems of wild S. azurea tend to be long and unbranched, causing them to flop under the weight of their flowers. When grown in cultivation, its stems are sometimes cut back early in the growing season to encourage branching and slow the vertical growth of the plant to prevent lodging.

== Taxonomy ==
Salvia azurea was scientifically described by Martin Vahl in 1804, but attributed its description to André Michaux. It is classified in the Salvia genus in the family Lamiaceae. According to Plants of the World Online and World Flora Online, it has no valid varieties or subspecies. However, World Plants lists Salvia azurea var. grandiflora as valid, as does the Natural Resources Conservation Service database.

=== Names ===
Salvia azurea is known by the common name blue sage. It is additionally known as pitcher sage, azure blue sage, and azure sage. It is also sometimes known as prairie sage.

== Distribution and habitat ==
Blue sage is native to the United States, but its natural range is disputed with different scholarly sources reporting different areas where it has been introduced in the US. Plants of the World Online and World Flora Online both report it as a introduced species in the northeastern U.S. in New York, Massachusetts, Connecticut, and New Hampshire, as well as in the Midwestern state of Wisconsin. In the book Flora of the Great Plains, botanist Ralph E. Brooks listed it as additionally introduced to eastern Colorado and western Nebraska, though native to southeastern parts of Nebraska. It is also reported to have escaped cultivation in India.

It is very common in the southern Great Plains, being found there in the eastern three-quarters of Kansas, much of Oklahoma, and south-central Missouri, southeastern Nebraska, and East Texas. It is also fairly common in the Southeastern U.S. in Arkansas, Louisiana, Mississippi, Georgia, South Carolina, and Florida. It is also reported by World Plants as native to Chihuahua and Nuevo León in northern Mexico.

It grows along roadsides throughout its range. It grows on rocky or sandy prairies, especially in uplands and pastures. In the Southeast, it is found in rocky or sandy woodlands such as longleaf pine sandhills. It is especially associated with loamy swales and flats within these woods.

== Ecology ==
Salvia azurea is insect pollinated and is recorded to have been visited in northern Florida by Bombus impatiens, Caupolicana electa, and Tetraloniella cressoniana.
