= Pachyphyllone =

- Chemical structure of pachyphyllone

Names
- IUPAC name (1R,4S,9R)-11-Hydroxy-5,5-dimethyl-13-propan-2-yl-15-oxatetracyclo[7.5.2.0^{1,10}.0^{4,9}]hexadeca-10,13-dien-12-one

Identifiers
| 3D model (JSmol) | Interactive image |
| ChEMBL | ChEMBL491878 |
| ChemSpider | 23339124 |
| PubChem CID | 44566415 |
| CompTox Dashboard (EPA) | DTXSID101030160 |
- InChI: InChI=1S/C20H28O3/c1-12(2)13-10-20-9-6-14-18(3,4)7-5-8-19(14,11-23-20)17(20)16(22)15(13)21/h10,12,14,22H,5-9,11H2,1-4H3/t14-,19+,20+/m0/s1 Key: UXYAZXBEJDOGCG-VHKYSDTDSA-N
- SMILES: CC(C)C1=CC23CCC4C(CCCC4(C2=C(C1=O)O)CO3)(C)C

Properties
| Chemical formula | C_{20}H_{28}O_{3} |
| Molar mass | 316.441 g·mol^{−1} |
- Except where otherwise noted, data are given for materials in their standard state (at 25 °C [77 °F], 100 kPa). Infobox references

Pachyphyllone is a diterpenoid of the abietane class found in the herb mountain desert sage (Salvia pachyphylla).

== See also ==
- List of phytochemicals in food
