= Lambertianic acid =

Names
- IUPAC name methyl (1S,4aR,5S,8aR)-5-[2-(furan-3-yl)ethyl]-4a-methyl-6-methylidene-1,2,3,4,5,7,8,8a-octahydronaphthalene-1-carboxylate

Identifiers
CAS Number	4966-13-6
3D model (JSmol)	Interactive image
ChemSpider	164211
PubChem CID	188983
CompTox Dashboard (EPA)	DTXSID90904826
- InChI: InChI=1S/C20H28O3/c1-14-6-8-18-16(19(21)22-3)5-4-11-20(18,2)17(14)9-7-15-10-12-23-13-15/h10,12-13,16-18H,1,4-9,11H2,2-3H3/t16-,17-,18+,20-/m0/s1 Key: XZOUFGJMCGQXNM-GNBUJSLZSA-N
- SMILES: CC12CCCC(C1CCC(=C)C2CCC3=COC=C3)C(=O)OC

Properties
Chemical formula	C_{20}H_{28}O_{3}
Molar mass	316.441 g·mol^{−1}
Density	1.09 g/cm^{3}
Melting point	213 °C (415 °F; 486 K)
Boiling point	428 °C (802 °F; 701 K)
Solubility in water	insoluble
Solubility	soluble in chloroform, methanol, ethyl acetate, DMSO

Hazards
Flash point	213 °C
- Except where otherwise noted, data are given for materials in their standard state (at 25 °C [77 °F], 100 kPa). Infobox references

Lambertianic acid is a naturally occurring organic compound classified as a diterpenoid with the molecular formula C_{20}H_{28}O_{3}. This is a tricyclic carboxylic acid first isolated from the oleoresin of the Lambert pine (Pinus lambertiana), from which it derives its name. The acid is a member of the abietane family of diterpenes, characterized by its aromatic C-ring.

== Occurrence ==
Lambertianic acid was first reported by Dauben and German in the mid-20th century as a major acidic constituent of the oleoresin (a mixture of resin acids and terpenes) of the sugar pine (Pinus lambertiana). The acid is biosynthesized in pine trees from geranylgeranyl pyrophosphate via the diterpenoid pathway and serves as a defensive compound against insects and pathogens. The compound has also been found, often in smaller quantities, in other Pinus species and some species of the Lamiaceae family.

== Structure ==
Lambertianic acid is based on the abietane carbon skeleton. Its structure consists of three fused six-membered rings (phenanthrene framework) with a carboxylic acid (–COOH) group at the C-18 position (the fourth carbon of the original abietane side chain) and three conjugated double bonds in rings B and C at the positions 8, 11, and 13. This conjugated system contributes to its reactivity and spectroscopic properties. Lambertianic acid is an optical isomer of daniellic acid.

== Uses ==
Reports indicate that the acid may offer health benefits by mitigating obesity, allergies, and various cancers such as those of the breast, liver, lung, and prostate. Its anticancer effects stem from suppressing the proliferation and survival of cancer cells.

== Related compounds ==
Lambertianic acid is structurally related to several other commercially and biologically important resin acids:

- Abietic acid: The most common and commercially significant resin acid.
- Dehydroabietic acid: An aromatic diterpene with similar structure and applications.
- Pimaric acid: A structural isomer with a different ring fusion.
