= Sustanon =

Sustanon may refer to:

- Testosterone propionate/testosterone phenylpropionate/testosterone isocaproate/testosterone decanoate (Sustanon 250)
- Testosterone propionate/testosterone phenylpropionate/testosterone isocaproate (Sustanon 100)
