= Androstenediol acetate =

Androstenediol acetate may refer to:

- Androstenediol 3β-acetate
- Androstenediol 17β-acetate
- Androstenediol 3β,17β-diacetate
