= Hydroxyprogesterone (disambiguation) =

Hydroxyprogesterone (OHP) may refer to:

- 3α-Hydroxyprogesterone (3α-dihydroprogesterone)
- 3β-Hydroxyprogesterone (3β-dihydroprogesterone)
- 6β-Hydroxyprogesterone
- 11α-Hydroxyprogesterone
- 11β-Hydroxyprogesterone (21-deoxycorticosterone)
- 15β-Hydroxyprogesterone
- 16α-Hydroxyprogesterone
- 17α-Hydroxyprogesterone
- 20α-Hydroxyprogesterone
- 21-Hydroxyprogesterone (11-deoxycorticosterone)

== See also ==
- Progesterone
- Pregnanolone
- Pregnanedione
- Pregnanediol
- Pregnanetriol
- Dihydroprogesterone
