= Pharmacokinetics of progesterone =

Clinical data
- Routes of administration: By mouth (capsule); Sublingual (tablet); Transdermal (cream, gel); Vaginal (capsule, tablet, gel, suppository, ring); Rectal (suppository); IM injection (oil solution); SC injection (aq. soln.); Intrauterine (IUD)
- Drug class: Progestogen; Antimineralocorticoid; Neurosteroid

Pharmacokinetic data
- Bioavailability: Oral: <2.4% Vaginal (micronized insert): 4–8%
- Protein binding: 98–99%: Albumin: 80%; CBG: 18%; SHBG: <1%; Free: 1–2%
- Metabolism: Mainly liver: 5α- and 5β-reductase; 3α- and 3β-HSD; 20α- and 20β-HSD; Conjugation; 17α-Hydroxylase; 21-Hydroxylase; CYPs (e.g., CYP3A4)
- Metabolites: Dihydroprogesterones; Pregnanolones; Pregnanediols; 20α-Hydroxyprogesterone; 17α-Hydroxyprogesterone; Pregnanetriols; 11-Deoxycorticosterone (And glucuronide/sulfate conjugates)
- Elimination half-life: Oral: 5–10 hours (with food); Sublingual: 6–7 hours; Vaginal: 14–50 hours; Transdermal: 30–40 hours; IM: 20–28 hours; SC: 13–18 hours; IV: 3–90 minutes
- Excretion: Bile and urine

The pharmacokinetics of progesterone concerns the pharmacodynamics, pharmacokinetics, and various routes of administration of progesterone.

Progesterone is a naturally occurring and bioidentical progestogen, or an agonist of the progesterone receptor, the biological target of progestogens like endogenous progesterone. Progesterone also has antimineralocorticoid and inhibitory neurosteroid activity, whereas it appears to have little or no glucocorticoid or antiandrogenic activity and has no androgenic activity. Because of its progestogenic activity, progesterone has functional antiestrogenic effects in certain tissues such as the uterus, cervix, and vagina. In addition, progesterone has antigonadotropic effects due to its progestogenic activity and can inhibit fertility and suppress sex hormone production. Progesterone differs from progestins (synthetic progestogens) like medroxyprogesterone acetate and norethisterone, with implications for pharmacodynamics and pharmacokinetics as well as efficacy, tolerability, and safety.

Progesterone can be taken by mouth, in through the vagina, and by injection into muscle or fat, among other routes. A progesterone vaginal ring and progesterone intrauterine device are also available as pharmaceutical products.

== Normal levels ==
Progesterone is used as part of hormone replacement therapy in people who have low progesterone levels, and for other reasons. For purposes of comparison with normal physiological circumstances, luteal phase levels of progesterone are 4 to 30 ng/mL, while follicular phase levels of progesterone are 0.02 to 0.9 ng/mL, menopausal levels are 0.03 to 0.3 ng/mL, and levels of progesterone in men are 0.12 to 0.3 ng/mL. During pregnancy, levels of progesterone in the first 4 to 8 weeks are 25 to 75 ng/mL, and levels are typically around 140 to 200 ng/mL at term. Production of progesterone in the body in late pregnancy is approximately 250 mg per day, 90% of which reaches the maternal circulation.

Normal progesterone levels in women
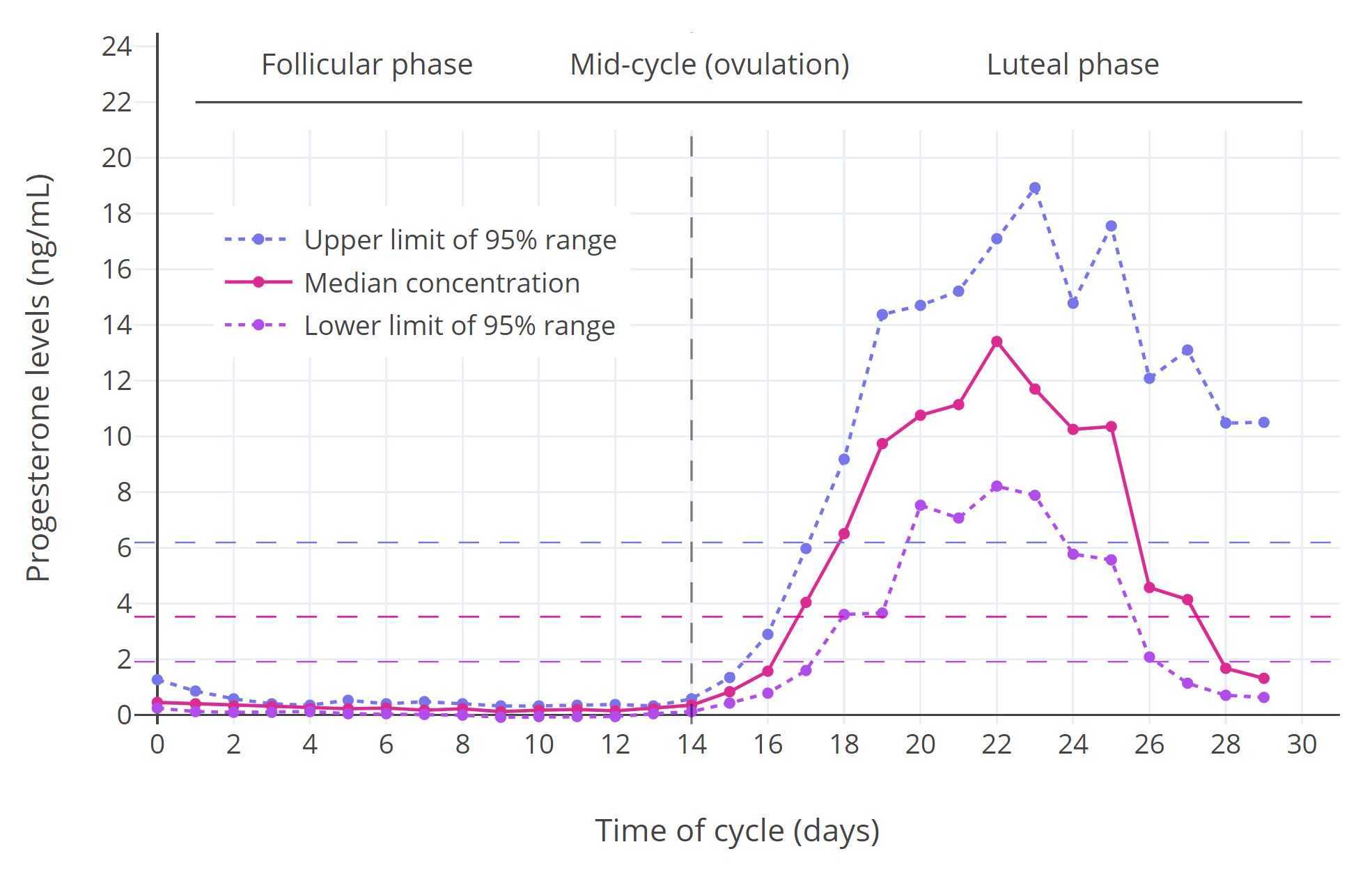
Progesterone levels across the menstrual cycle in normally cycling, ovulatory women. The dashed horizontal lines are the mean integrated levels for each curve and the dashed vertical line is mid-cycle (around when ovulation occurs).

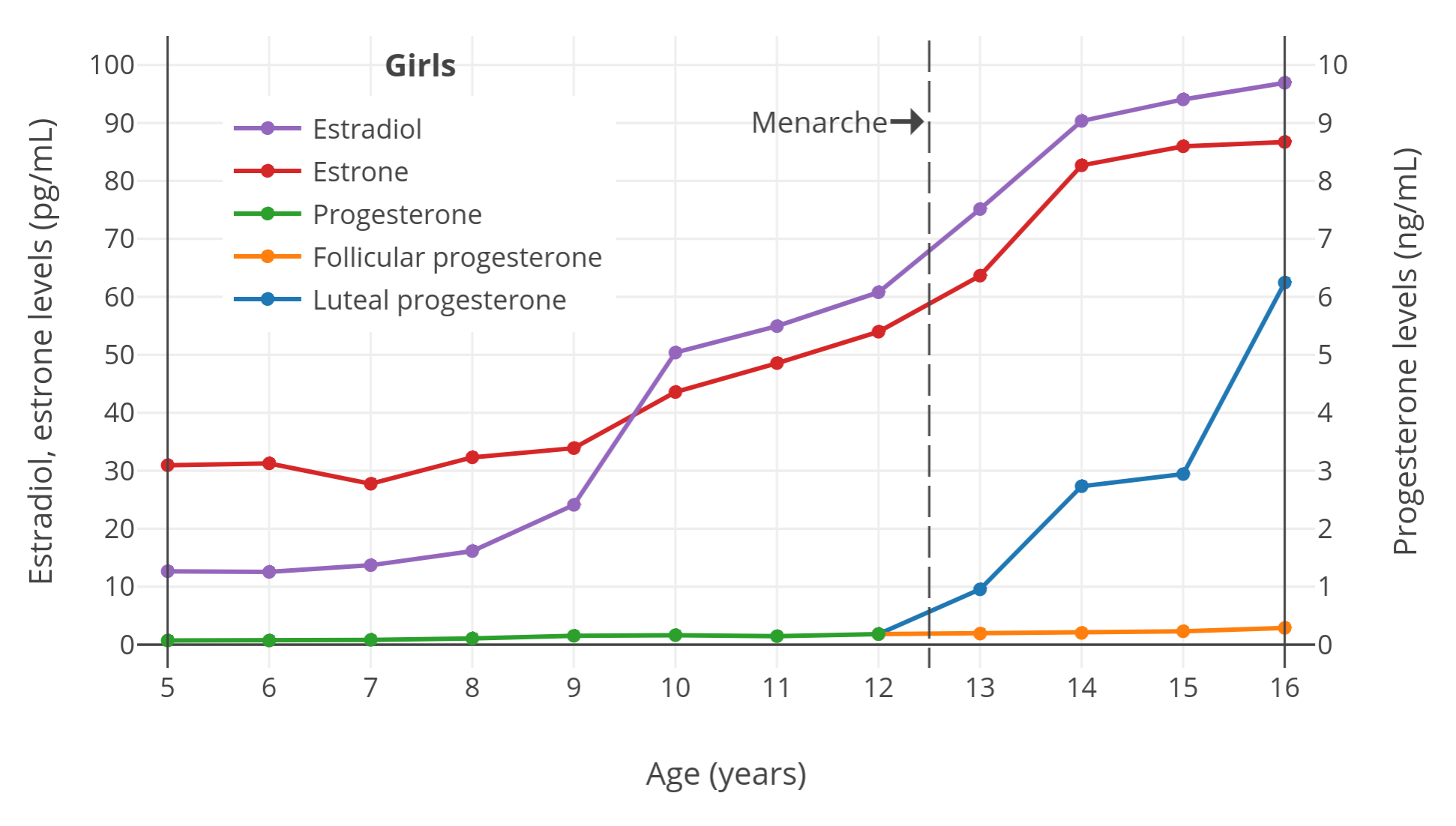
Estrogen and progesterone levels during childhood and adolescence, including puberty, in girls. The dashed vertical line is the average age of menarche (first menstruation and onset of menstrual cycles).

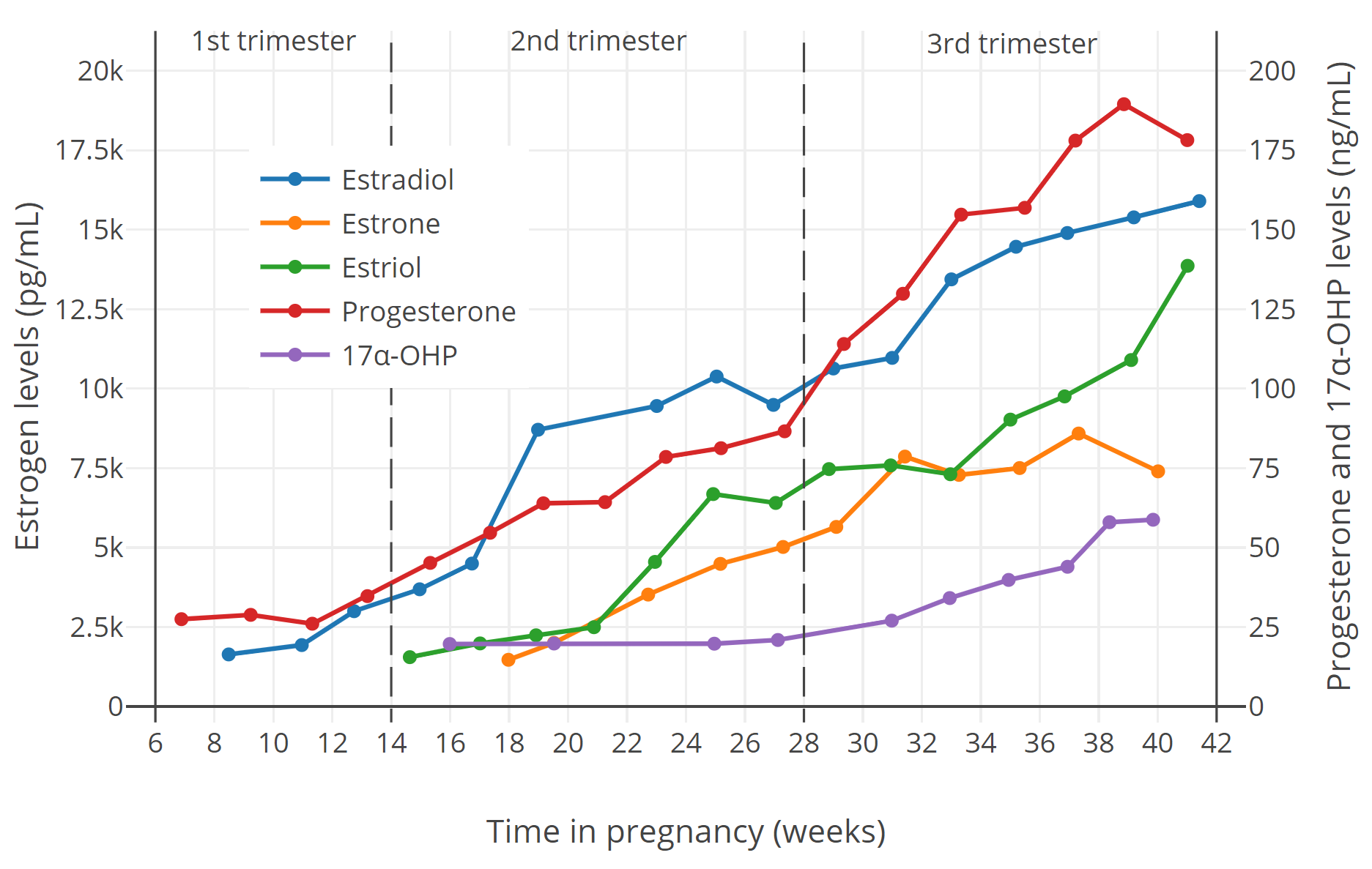
Estrogen, progesterone, and 17α-hydroxyprogesterone (17α-OHP) levels during pregnancy in women. The dashed vertical lines separate the trimesters.

== Routes of administration ==
Progesterone pharmacokinetics by route
Route	Form	Dose	C_{max} (ng/mL)	T_{max} (hours)	t_{1/2} (hours)
Oral	Capsule	200 mg	4.3–11.7	2–2.5	?
Sublingual	Tablet (Note: Brand name Luteina.)	100 mg	13.5	1–4	~6–7
Sublingual	Suspension	100 mg	17.6	0.5–1	?
Vaginal	Tablet	100 mg	10.9	6–7	13.7
Vaginal	Capsule	100 mg	9.7	1–3	?
Intramuscular injection	Oil solution	50 mg	14.3	8.7	?
Intramuscular injection	Oil solution	100 mg	113	6.7	22.3
Intramuscular injection	Aq. solution (Note: Complexed with another molecule to increase water solubility - progesterone has negligible water solubility on its own.)	100 mg	440	0.88	14.3
Subcutaneous injection	Aq. solution	25 mg	57.8	0.92	13.1
Subcutaneous injection	Aq. solution	50 mg	103	0.92	17.2
Subcutaneous injection	Aq. solution	100 mg	235–300	0.92	17.2–17.6

Available forms of progesterone (Note: Sources:) (Note: This table only includes products where progesterone is the sole active ingredient.)
Route	Form	Dose	Brand name	Availability (Note: See also: Progesterone (medication) § Availability)
Oral	Capsule	100, 200, 300 mg	Prometrium (Note: Other brand names exist.)	Widespread
Oral	Tablet (SR)	200, 300, 400 mg	Dubagest SR	India
Sublingual	Tablet	10, 25, 50, 100 mg	Luteina	Europe (Note: Specifically in Poland and Ukraine.)
Transdermal	Gel (Note: For local application to the breasts; negligible systemic effect.)	1% (25 mg)	Progestogel	Europe
Vaginal	Capsule	100, 200, 300 mg	Utrogestan	Widespread
Vaginal	Tablet	100 mg	Endometrin	Widespread
Vaginal	Gel	4, 8% (45, 90 mg)	Crinone	Widespread
Vaginal	Suppository	200, 400 mg	Cyclogest	Europe
Vaginal	Ring	10 mg/day (Note: One progesterone vaginal ring provides 10mg of progesterone each day for 3 months.)	Fertiring	South America (Note: Specifically in Chile, Ecuador, and Peru.)
Rectal	Suppository	200, 400 mg	Cyclogest	Europe
Uterine	IUD	38 mg	Progestasert	Discontinued
Intramuscular injection	Oil solution	2, 5, 10, 20, 25, 50, 100 mg/mL	Proluton	Widespread
Intramuscular injection	Aq. susp.	12.5, 30, 100 mg/mL	Agolutin	Europe (Note: Specifically the Czech Republic and Slovakia.)
Intramuscular injection	Emulsion	5, 10, 25 mg/mL	Di-Pro-Emulsion	Discontinued
Intramuscular injection	Microsph.	20, 100 mg/mL	ProSphere	Mexico
Subcutaneous	Aq. soln. (inj.)	25 mg/vial	Prolutex	Europe
Subcutaneous	Implant	50, 100 mg	Proluton	Discontinued
Intravenous	Aq. soln. (inj.)	20 mg/mL	Primolut	Discontinued
Sources and footnotes:

The pharmacokinetics of progesterone are dependent on its route of administration. The medication is approved in the form of oil-filled capsules containing micronized progesterone for oral administration, termed "oral micronized progesterone" ("OMP") or simply "oral progesterone". It is also available in the form of vaginal or rectal suppositories, vaginal gels, oil solutions for intramuscular injection, and aqueous solutions for subcutaneous injection, among others.

Routes of administration that progesterone has been used include oral, intranasal, transdermal, vaginal, rectal, intramuscular, subcutaneous, and intravenous injection. Oral progesterone has been found to be inferior to vaginal and intramuscular progesterone in terms of absorption (low) and clearance rate (rapid). Vaginal progesterone is available in the forms of progesterone gel, rings, and suppositories or pessaries. Advantages of intravaginal progesterone over oral administration include high bioavailability, rapid absorption, avoidance of first-pass metabolism, sustained plasma concentrations, and a local endometrial effect, while advantages of intravaginal progesterone relative to intramuscular injection include greater convenience and lack of injection site pain.

Intranasal progesterone as a nasal spray is effective in achieving therapeutic levels, and was not associated with nasal irritation, but was associated with an unpleasant taste of the spray. Rectal, intramuscular, and intravenous routes may be inconvenient, especially for long-term treatment. Plasma levels of progesterone are similar after vaginal and rectal administration in spite of the different routes of administration, and rectal administration is an alternative to vaginal progesterone in conditions of vaginal infection, cystitis, recent childbirth, or when barrier contraception methods are used. Intramuscular injection of progesterone may achieve much higher levels of progesterone than normal luteal phase concentrations and levels achieved with other routes.

=== Oral administration ===
==== Methodological issues in studies ====
Knowledge about the pharmacokinetics of oral progesterone has been complicated by the use of flawed analytical techniques. When progesterone is taken orally, due to first-pass metabolism, very high levels of its metabolites occur. Most previous studies have used a method known as immunoassay (IA) to measure progesterone levels. However, IA without chromatographic separation (CS) has high cross-reactivity and is unable to differentiate between progesterone and metabolites such as allopregnanolone and pregnanolone. As a result, studies that have assessed the pharmacokinetics of oral progesterone using IA have reported falsely high progesterone levels and inaccurate dependent pharmacokinetic parameters.

Comparative studies using reliable and exact methods such as liquid chromatography–mass spectrometry (LC–MS) and IA in conjunction with adequate CS have found that IA without CS overestimates levels of progesterone by 5- to 8-fold. For this reason, the use of reliable assays is mandatory when studying the pharmacokinetics of oral progesterone, and an awareness of these methodological issues is likewise essential for an accurate understanding of the pharmacokinetics of oral progesterone. Conversely, the same issues are not applicable to parenteral routes of progesterone such as vaginal administration and intramuscular injection, because these routes are not subject to a first pass and relatively low levels of progesterone metabolites are formed.

==== Absorption, bioavailability, and levels ====
The oral bioavailability of progesterone is very low. Studies using IA have generally measured the bioavailability of oral progesterone as less than 10%, with one study reporting values of 6.2 to 8.6%. However, these values are overestimations; a study using LC–MS found that the bioavailability of oral progesterone was only 2.4% relative to vaginal progesterone gel. Moreover, this was not relative to the standard of progesterone by intramuscular injection, which has much higher bioavailability than vaginal progesterone. The very low bioavailability of oral progesterone is due to the fact that it is poorly absorbed from the gastrointestinal tract and undergoes massive metabolism, resulting in almost complete inactivation during the first pass through the liver. Because of its poor oral bioavailability, very high doses of progesterone must be used by the oral route to achieve significant circulating progesterone levels. In addition, oral progesterone today is always micronized and suspended in oil. This improves the bioavailability of oral progesterone significantly compared to plain milled progesterone, and allows for it to be used at practical doses. When the term "oral progesterone" is used, what is used clinically and what is almost always being referred to, unless noted otherwise, is micronized progesterone suspended in oil.

Micronization is the process of reducing the average diameter of the particles of a solid material. By micronizing progesterone, its particles are made smaller (mainly <10 μM) and its surface area is increased, thereby enhancing absorption from the intestines. Suspension and partial solubilization of progesterone in oil containing medium- to long-chain fatty acids likewise improves the bioavailability of oral progesterone. Progesterone is a lipophilic compound and it has been theorized that suspension of progesterone in oil may improve its absorption by the lymphatic system, thereby allowing a portion of oral progesterone to bypass the first pass through the liver and hence enhancing its bioavailability. Compared to plain milled progesterone, peak levels of progesterone following a single 200 mg oral dose were increased 1.4-fold by micronization, 1.2-fold by suspension in oil, and 3.2-fold by the combination of micronization and suspension in oil. Oral micronized progesterone suspended in oil is rapidly and almost completely absorbed from the intestines. There is wide interindividual variability in the bioavailability of oral progesterone. As progesterone was not used orally for many decades due to its poor bioavailability (until the introduction of oral micronized progesterone in oil-filled gelatin capsules in 1980), oral progestins (synthetic progestogens) with improved metabolic stability and high oral bioavailability were developed and have been used clinically instead.

When oral progesterone is used at typical clinical dosages, only very low levels of progesterone are measured using reliable methods. Following single doses of oral progesterone, peak levels of progesterone of 1.5 to 2.4 ng/mL with 100 mg and 2.8 to 4.7 ng/mL with 200 mg have been measured using LC–MS, liquid chromatography–tandem mass spectrometry (LC–MS/MS), and IA with adequate CS. In one such study, although peak levels of progesterone were 2.2 ng/mL after a single 100 mg dose of oral progesterone, levels of progesterone remained significantly elevated for less than about 4 hours, and the average progesterone levels over a period of 24 hours were only 0.14 ng/mL. For comparison, normal progesterone levels during the luteal phase of the menstrual cycle with LC–MS/MS are 6.7 to 22.2 ng/mL. When IA alone has been used to measure progesterone levels with oral progesterone, far higher peak levels of 6.5 to 10.2 ng/mL, 13.8 to 19.9 ng/mL, and 32.3 to 49.8 ng/mL have been observed after single 100, 200, and 300 mg doses, respectively. One IA-based study even reported maximal progesterone levels of 16 to 626 ng/mL (mean 247 ng/mL) with a single 300 mg dose of oral progesterone.

When oral progesterone is taken with food instead of fast, peak and overall levels of progesterone are significantly higher. A study using LC-MS/MS found that when 100 mg oral progesterone was taken within 30 minutes of starting a high-fat meal, peak levels of progesterone were 2.6-fold higher and area-under-the-curve levels were 1.8-fold higher when compared to taking it in a fasted state. In another study, peak levels of progesterone were increased by 5-fold and area-under-the-curve levels by 2-fold when 200 mg oral progesterone was taken with food. However, this study used the unreliable method of IA to quantify progesterone levels. Although the bioavailability of oral progesterone is increased if it is taken with food, its overall bioavailability is still low, even if measured using IA. It has been suggested that the improvement in progesterone levels when oral progesterone is taken with food may be due to enhanced lymphatic absorption, allowing oral progesterone to partially bypass first-pass metabolism.

==== Elimination and duration ====
Levels of progesterone with oral progesterone have been measured by the unreliable method of IA as remaining elevated for 12 to 24 hours. Regardless of the assay method, peak levels of progesterone following a dose of oral progesterone occur after about 1 to 3 hours. The elimination half-life of progesterone in circulation is very short at a range of about 3 to 90 minutes. Previous studies using IA have reported an overestimated elimination half-life of oral progesterone of about 16 to 18 hours. Subsequent, reliable studies using high-performance liquid chromatography–tandem mass spectrometry (HPLC–MS/MS) and similar methods reported elimination half-lives of progesterone with oral progesterone of about 4.6 to 5.2 hours and 9.98 hours when it was taken with food. Due to the short half-life and duration of action of oral progesterone, it may be taken in divided doses two or three times per day.

==== First-pass effect and neurosteroids ====
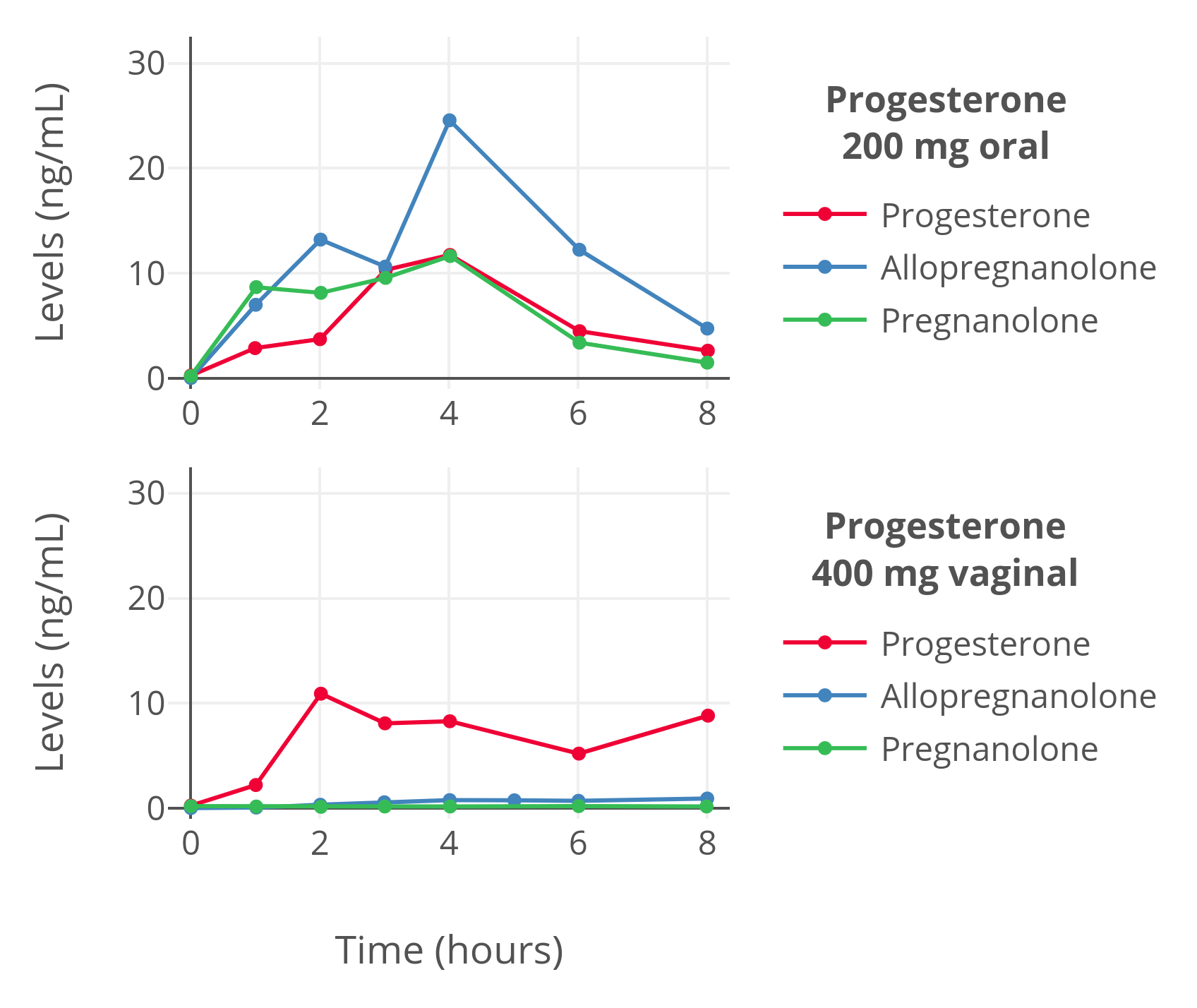
Levels of progesterone, allopregnanolone, and pregnanolone in premenopausal women following a single dose of 200 mg oral progesterone or 400 mg vaginal progesterone (as a suppository). Allopregnanolone and pregnanolone levels were determined by GC-MS, while progesterone levels were determined by IA with chromatographic separation via LC–MS.

Progesterone is metabolized into allopregnanolone and pregnanolone, which are neurosteroids and potent potentiators of the GABA_{A} receptor. The conversion of progesterone into these metabolites is catalyzed by the enzymes 5α- and 5β-reductase and 3α-hydroxysteroid dehydrogenase, and occurs primarily in the liver, but also occurs in reproductive endocrine tissues, the skin, the brain, and other tissues. Due to extensive first-pass metabolism with oral progesterone, about 80 to 90% or more of progesterone is rapidly transformed into these metabolites, and massive quantities of these neurosteroids are consequently formed and circulate throughout the body and brain. It is for this reason that commonly reported side effects of oral progesterone include dizziness, drowsiness, sedation, somnolence, and fatigue. Both oral and sufficiently high doses of intramuscular progesterone can produce these sedative effects. However, compared to oral progesterone, the levels of these neurosteroids have been found to be very low with parenteral routes like vaginal and intramuscular progesterone. As with the bioavailability of oral progesterone, there is high interindividual variability in the formation and levels of allopregnanolone and pregnanolone with oral progesterone. As a result, some individuals may experience considerable central depressant effects with oral progesterone, whereas others may experience minimal such effects.

With oral administration of progesterone, allopregnanolone and pregnanolone circulate at higher concentrations than progesterone. These neurosteroid metabolites of progesterone have relatively short biological half-lives in circulation. Because of this, there are dramatic and highly supraphysiological spikes in allopregnanolone and pregnanolone concentrations followed by steep declines with each oral intake of progesterone. As such, neurosteroid levels fluctuate substantially (e.g., 15-fold in the case of allopregnanolone) and in an unphysiological manner with oral progesterone therapy. In addition, consumption of food with oral progesterone increases its absorption by 2-fold, and this may also further amplify fluctuations in neurosteroid levels, particularly if food intake with progesterone is not consistent from dose to dose.

In contrast to oral administration, parenteral progesterone, such as with vaginal administration, avoids the first-pass effect, and is not associated with supraphysiological levels of neurosteroid metabolites, nor with spikes or marked fluctuations in neurosteroid levels. Parenteral routes can be used instead of oral administration to avoid adverse effects related to neurosteroid fluctuations if they prove to be problematic. Lower doses of oral progesterone (e.g., 100 mg/day) are also associated with relatively reduced formation of neurosteroid metabolites, and may similarly help to alleviate such side effects. In addition, the 5α-reductase inhibitor dutasteride, which blocks the production of allopregnanolone (though not of pregnanolone) from progesterone, has been found to diminish symptoms of premenstrual syndrome.

Pregnenolone, an over-the-counter supplement and close analogue of progesterone, is extensively converted into neurosteroids such as allopregnanolone and pregnanolone with oral administration similar to progesterone. Conversely, this was not seen with transdermal administration of pregnenolone.

==== Clinical progestogenic potency and effects ====
Because of studies that used IA, it was incorrectly believed for many years that oral progesterone could easily achieve luteal phase levels of progesterone or beyond and could produce considerable progestogenic effects. In actuality, the very low levels of progesterone with oral administration, as measured by reliable methods like LC–MS, appear to be insufficient for robust progestogenic effects. This is evidenced by the fact that, in contrast to almost all progestins, an increased risk of endometrial cancer has been observed when oral progesterone is combined with an estrogen in menopausal hormone therapy. This finding suggests that typical clinical doses of oral progesterone may be insufficient for full endometrial protection. However, in spite of the very low levels of progesterone achieved, typical clinical doses of oral progesterone are effective in preventing estrogen-induced endometrial hyperplasia. On the other hand, oral progesterone fails to produce full endometrial secretory transformation, and is considered to be inappropriate for use in assisted reproduction, whereas vaginal and intramuscular progesterone are effective. Even 600 mg/day oral progesterone, which is a very high dosage, fails to produce full luteal-phase endometrial changes, although doses of 300 to 600 mg/day oral progesterone have reportedly been used for luteal support in assisted reproduction. Research on whether oral non-micronized progesterone has a thermogenic effect has shown conflicting findings in different studies.

The low levels of progesterone with oral progesterone may also explain its differences in risk of breast cancer and venous thromboembolism relative to progestogens when added to estrogen therapy in postmenopausal women. Such risks are increased by progestins, which are PR agonists similar to progesterone, but have been found to be increased less or not at all by oral progesterone. Since typical clinical doses of oral progesterone achieve very low levels of progesterone, and progesterone therapy with luteal-phase progesterone levels has never been properly evaluated in sufficiently large clinical studies, it has been said that notion that progesterone somehow differs from progestins and does not increase the risk of breast cancer or venous thromboembolism is unsubstantiated. Moreover, in the absence of adequate data to the contrary, it would be reasonable to consider progesterone at least equivalent to progestins as a potential risk factor for such complications. Indeed, preclinical research suggests a carcinogenic role for progesterone in the breast, and the French E3N study observed a significantly higher risk of breast cancer with estrogen and oral progesterone therapy in postmenopausal women after long-term (>5-year) administration. This is potentially consistent with a weak proliferative effect of oral progesterone on the breasts such that a longer duration of exposure may be necessary for an increase in breast cancer risk to manifest.

==== Sustained-release formulation ====
A sustained-release tablet formulation of oral micronized progesterone (also known as "oral natural micronized progesterone sustained release" or "oral NMP SR") has been marketed in India under the brand names Dubagest SR, Gestofit SR, and Susten SR among others. It shows a slow and smooth profile of progesterone release over 24 hours and has an elimination half-life of 18 hours. This results in steadier and more sustained progesterone levels as well as minimization of the neurosteroid-related side effects of oral progesterone such as sedation.

==== Gallery ====
Hormone levels with oral progesterone
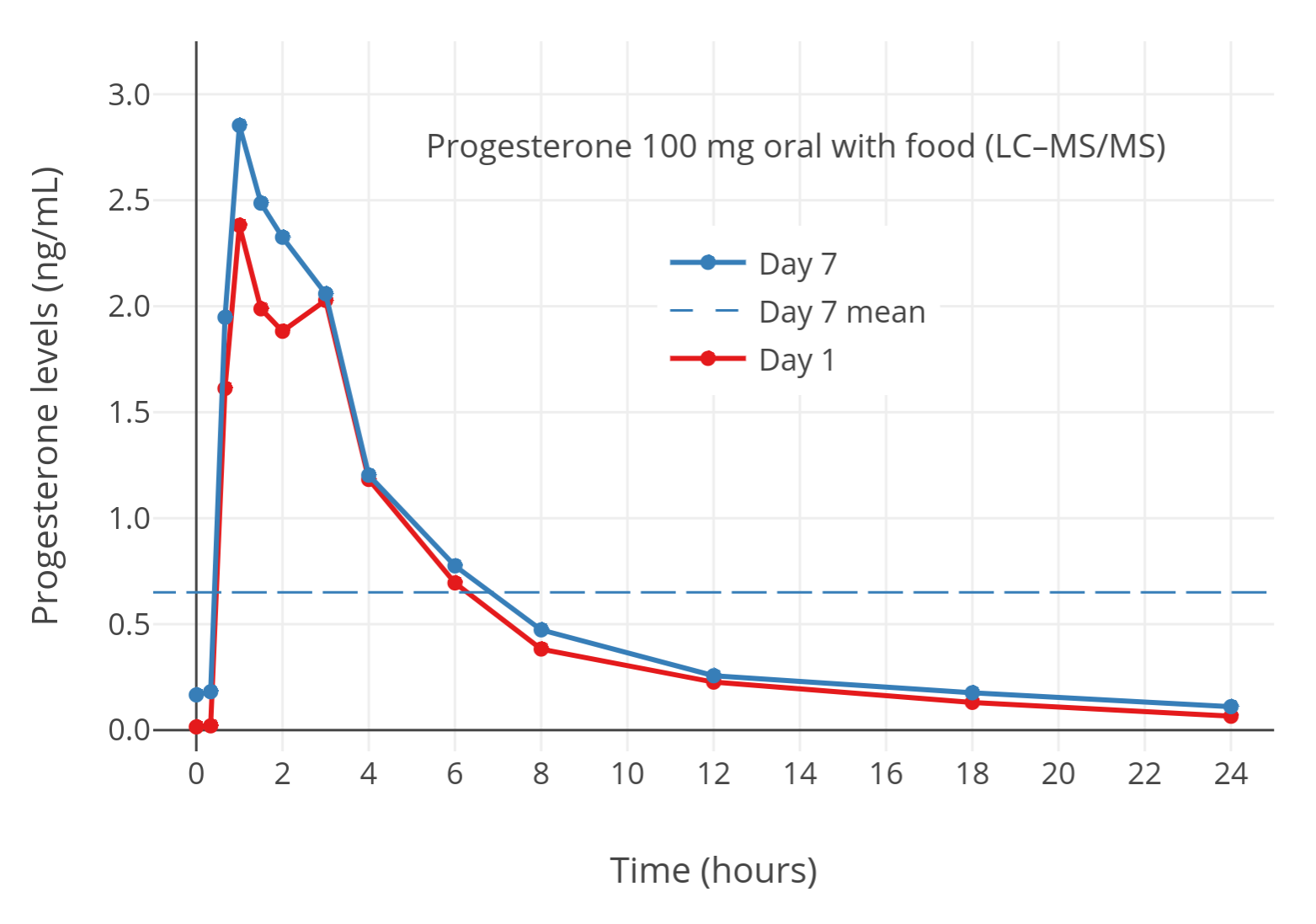
Progesterone levels measured by LC–MS/MS after a single dose or continuous administration for 7 days of 100 mg oral micronized progesterone with food in postmenopausal women. The horizontal dashed line is the mean integrated level over 24 hours.

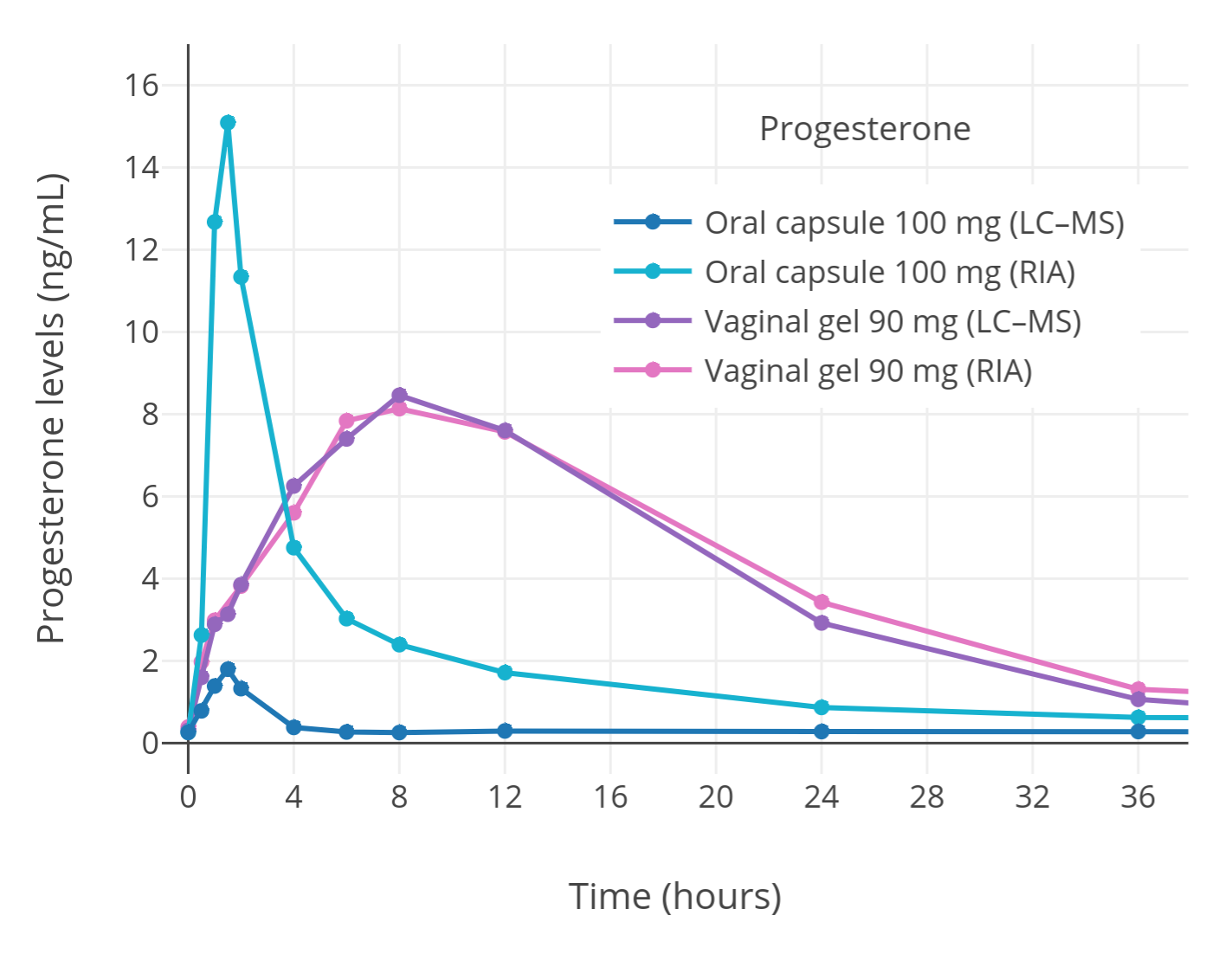
Progesterone levels measured by RIA or LC–MS after a single dose of 100 mg oral or vaginal micronized progesterone in postmenopausal women. Levels with oral progesterone measured by RIA are falsely high due to cross-reactivity, whereas levels measured by LC–MS are reliable and accurate.

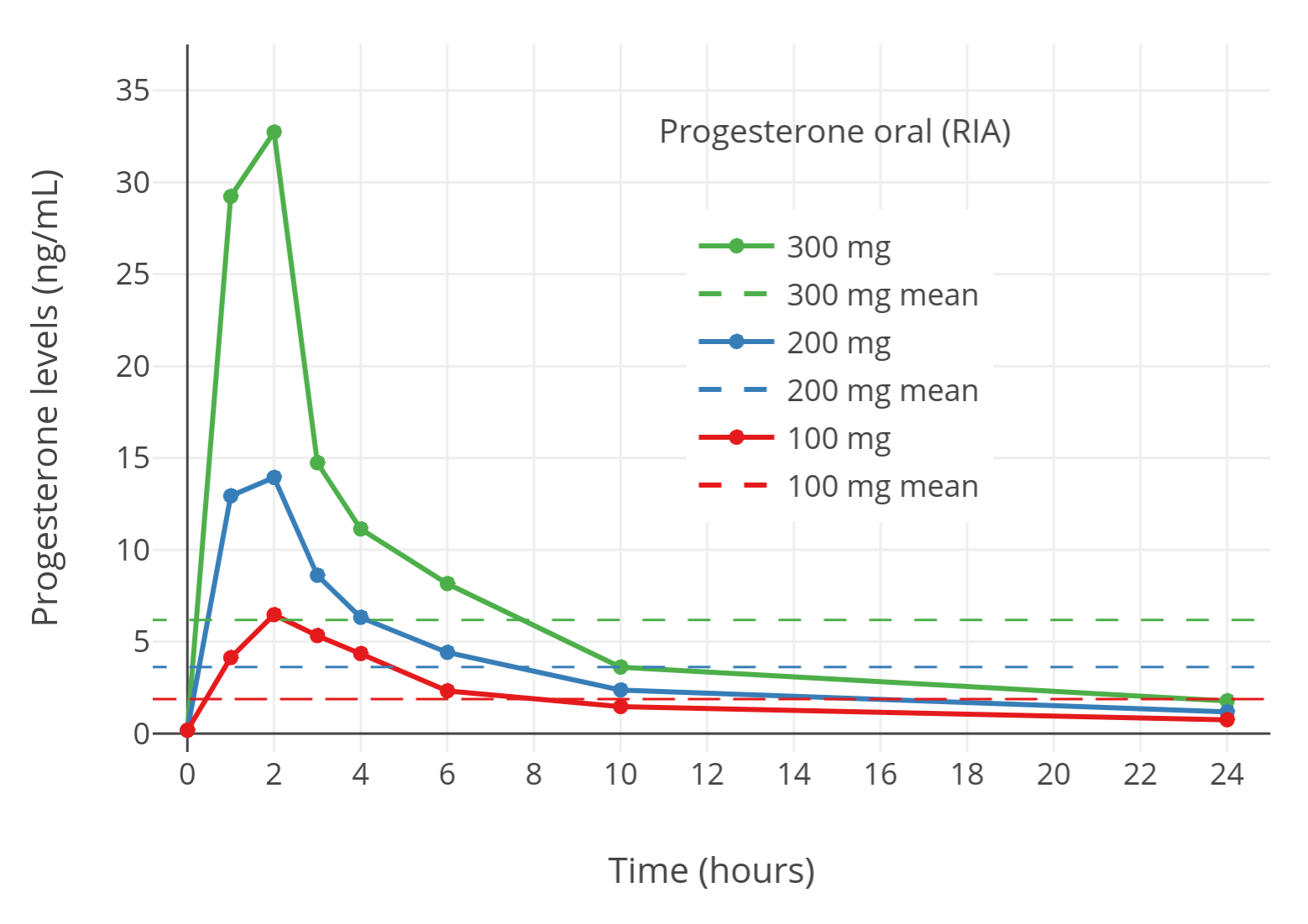
Progesterone levels measured by RIA after a single 100, 200, or 300 mg dose of oral micronized progesterone in postmenopausal women. The horizontal dashed lines are mean integrated levels over 24 hours. Levels are overestimated due to cross-reactivity with RIA.

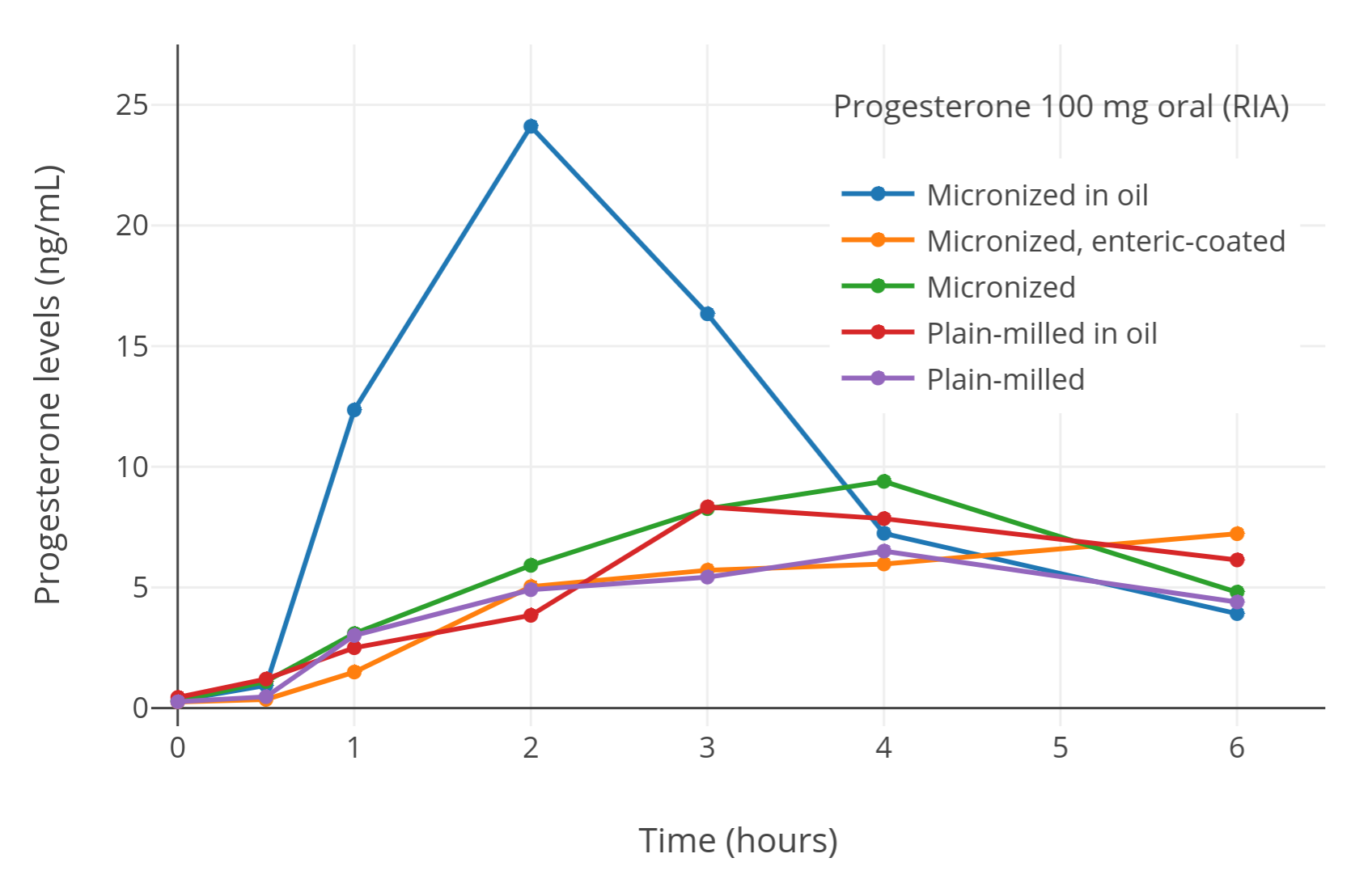
Progesterone levels measured by RIA after a single 100 mg oral dose of different preparations of progesterone powder contained in gelatin capsules in human volunteers. Levels are overestimated due to cross-reactivity with RIA.

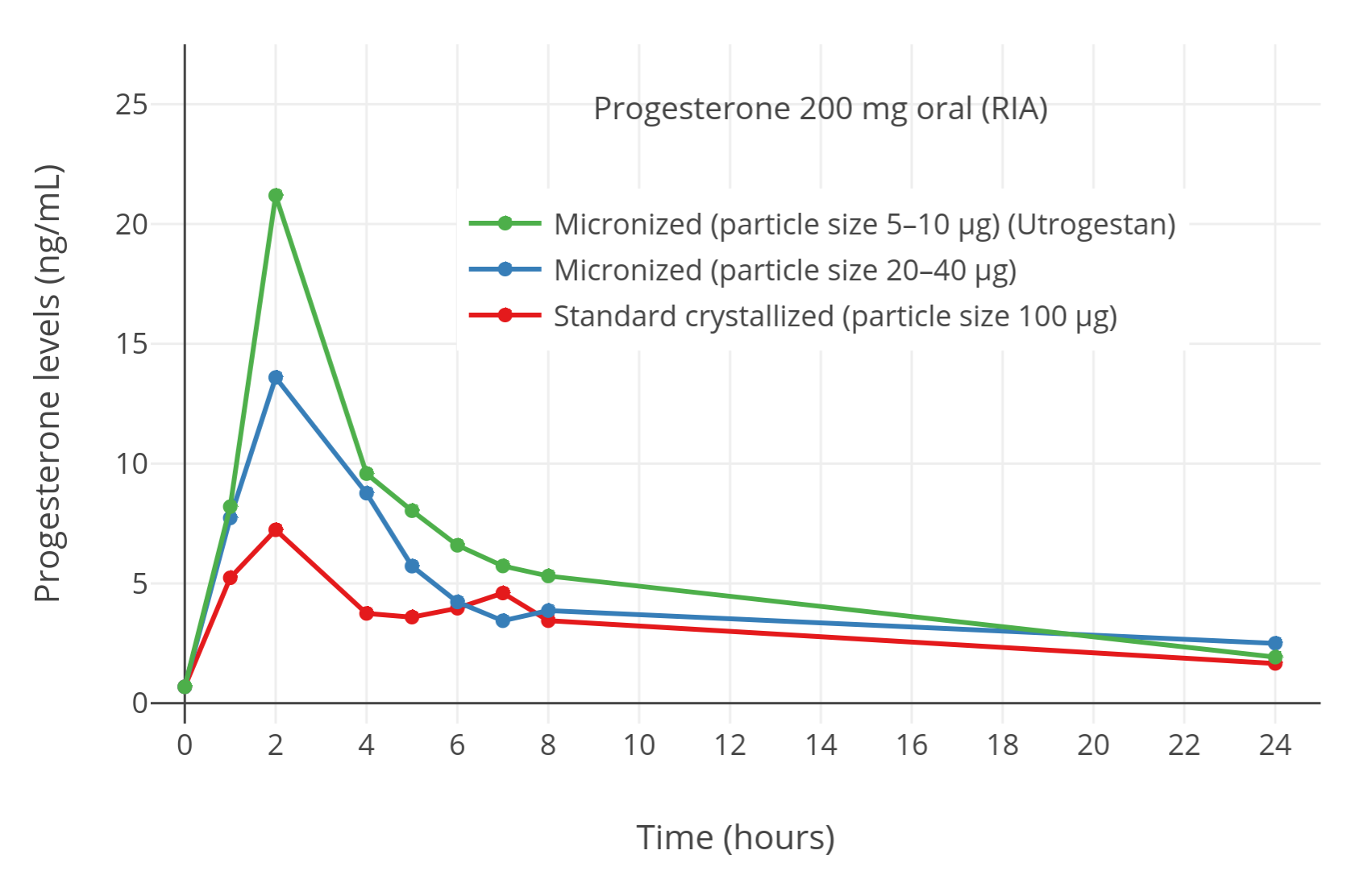
Progesterone levels with RIA after a single oral dose of 200 mg progesterone at different particle sizes in postmenopausal women. Levels are overestimated due to cross-reactivity with RIA.

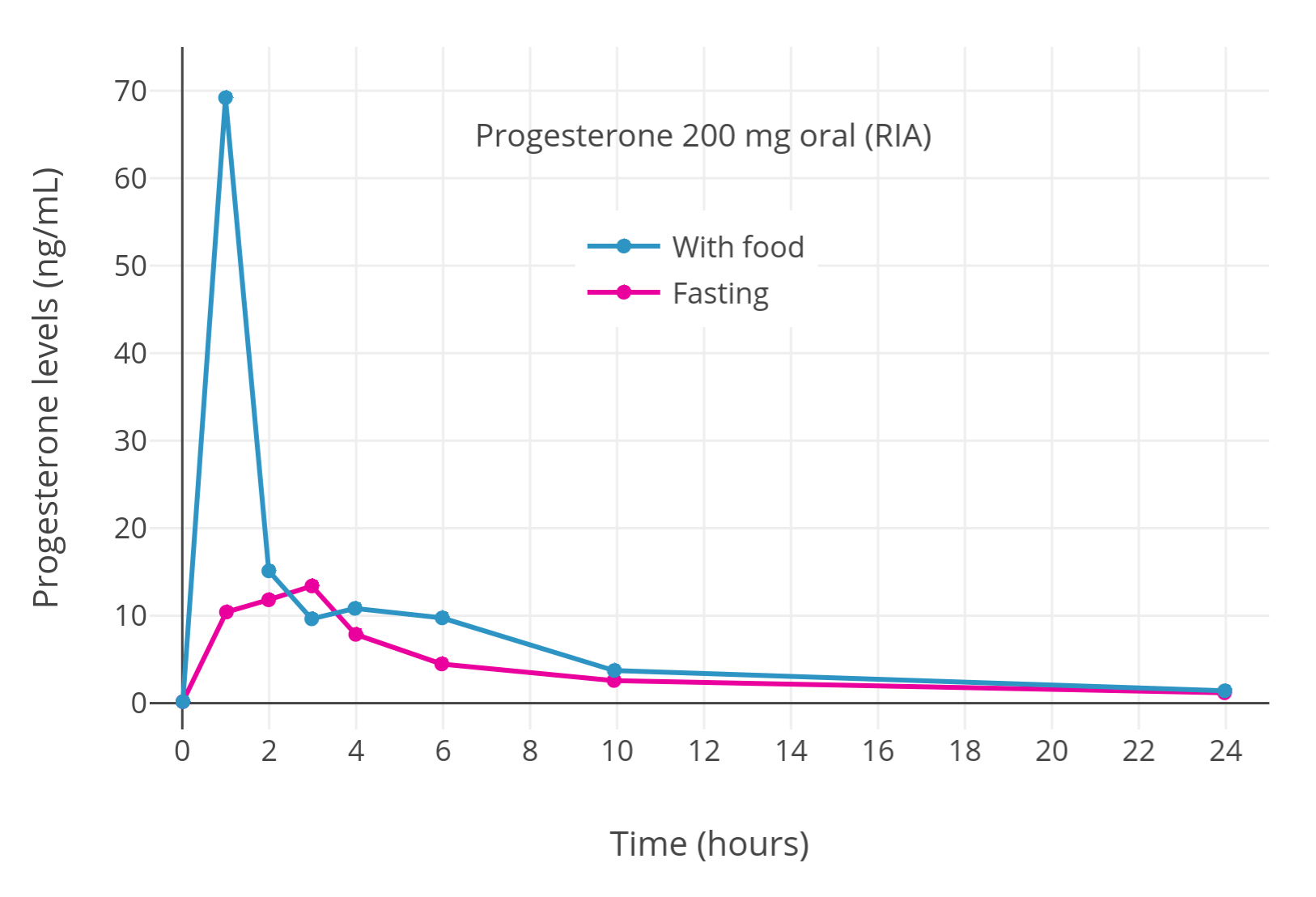
Progesterone levels with RIA after a single dose of 200 mg oral progesterone with or without food in postmenopausal women. Levels are overestimated due to cross-reactivity with RIA.

=== Buccal administration ===
Progesterone has been studied for use by buccal administration. The medication has been marketed in the form of buccal tablets under the brand names Progesterone Lingusorbs, Lutocylol, Membrettes, and Syngestrets, although these products are no longer available. The clinical dosage of buccal progesterone has been described as 10 to 50 mg/day relative to 5 to 60 mg/day in the case of intramuscular injection.

=== Sublingual administration ===
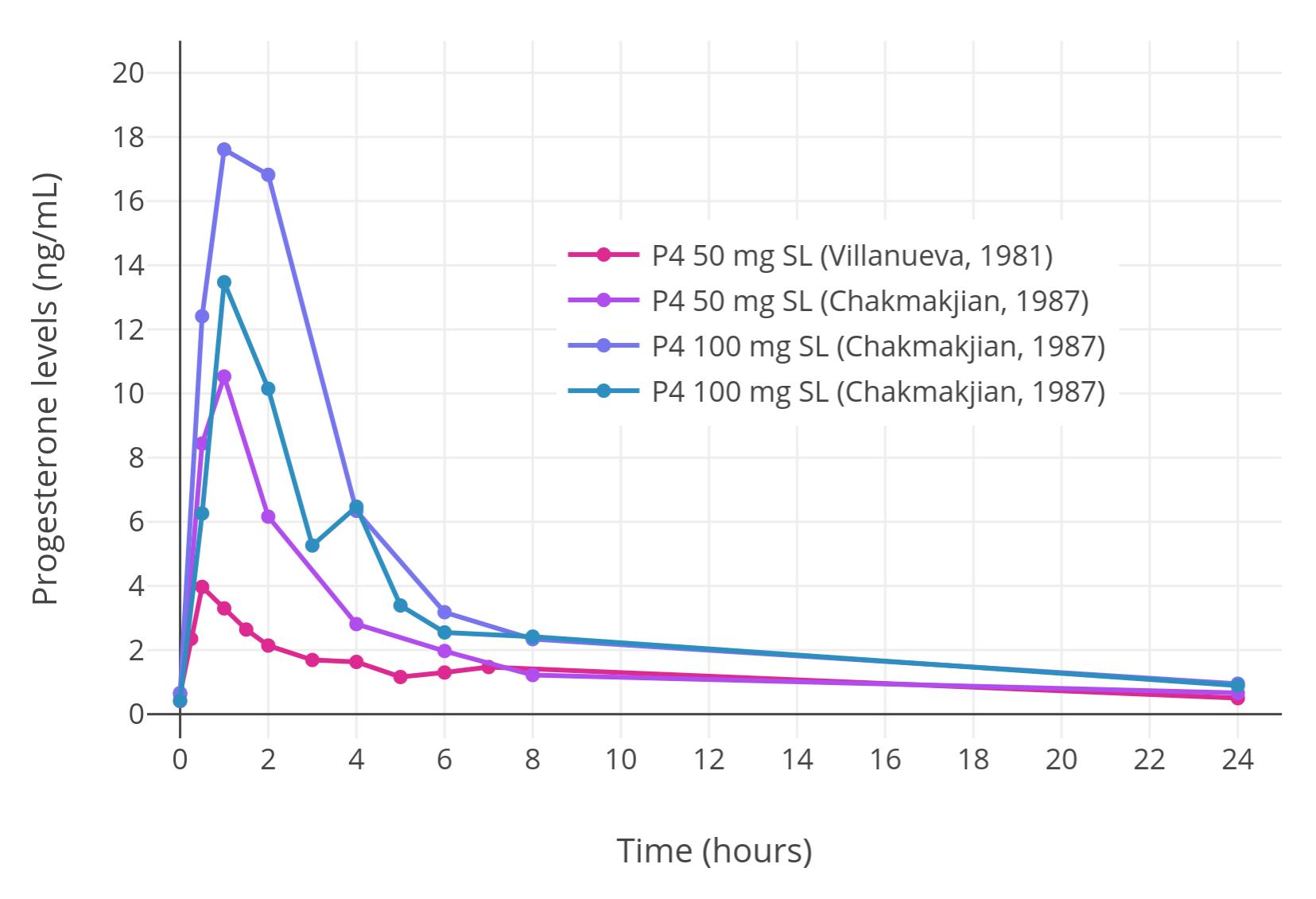
Levels of progesterone (P4) following a single sublingual (SL) dose of 50 or 100 mg progesterone in a suspension in women.

A micronized tablet formulation of progesterone marketed under the brand name Luteina is indicated for use by sublingual administration in addition to the vaginal route and is approved for use in Poland and Ukraine. Sublingual progesterone may also be available from compounding pharmacies in countries like the United States. Progesterone is used by the sublingual route at dosages of 50 to 150 mg three to four times per day. A single 100 mg sublingual dose of Luteina has been found to reach mean peak progesterone levels of 13.5 ng/mL after 1 to 4 hours, with an elimination half-life of about 6 to 7 hours.

A number of other studies have also investigated the use of progesterone by sublingual administration. Older studies have also explored sublingual progesterone. A study of sublingual progesterone for luteal support in patients undergoing embryo transfer found that after sublingual administration of 50 or 100 mg progesterone dissolved in a 1 mL suspension, peak levels of progesterone were reached in 30 to 60 minutes and were on average 17.61 ± 3.78 ng/mL with the 100-mg dose. However, the duration was short, with levels of less than 5 ng/mL at 6 hours, and re-administration had to be done two or three times per day for adequate circulating levels of progesterone to be maintained throughout the day. Another study found that sublingual progesterone had to be administered at a dose of 400 mg every 8 hours to achieve circulating levels similar to those produced by 100 mg/day intramuscular progesterone. One study administered 400 mg sublingual progesterone three times per day and achieved mean progesterone levels of 57.8 ± 37.4 ng/mL, which were similar to those produced by 50 mg/day intramuscular progesterone.

=== Intranasal administration ===
Progesterone has been evaluated by the intranasal route, in the form of a nasal spray, in one study. Progesterone levels were low and insufficient in terms of endometrial changes.

=== Transdermal administration ===
Progesterone for transdermal administration is not approved by the FDA in the United States. Multiple pharmaceutical companies have pursued the development of systemic transdermal progesterone formulations, but ultimately none have successfully been developed and introduced for clinical use. Although no formulations of transdermal progesterone are approved for systemic use, a 1% topical gel formulation of progesterone for local use on the breasts is approved to treat breast pain under the brand name Progestogel in various countries.

Although no formulations of transdermal progesterone are approved for systemic use, transdermal progesterone is available in the form of creams and gels from custom compounding pharmacies in some countries, and is also available over-the-counter without a prescription in the United States. Transdermal progesterone has been used by thousands of women as a component of menopausal hormone therapy in the United States and Europe. However, these products are unregulated and have not been clinically tested, often with little being known about their pharmacokinetics. In addition, the absorption of transdermal progesterone may differ significantly from formulation to formulation due to widely varying ingredients. Moreover, the systemic effectiveness of transdermal progesterone in producing therapeutic progestogenic effects, most importantly adequate endometrial protection against estrogens, is controversial.

Some unregulated transdermal progesterone products contain "wild yam extract" derived from Dioscorea villosa, but there is no evidence that the human body can convert its active ingredient (diosgenin, the plant steroid that is chemically converted to produce progesterone industrially) into progesterone.

==== Absorption and distribution ====
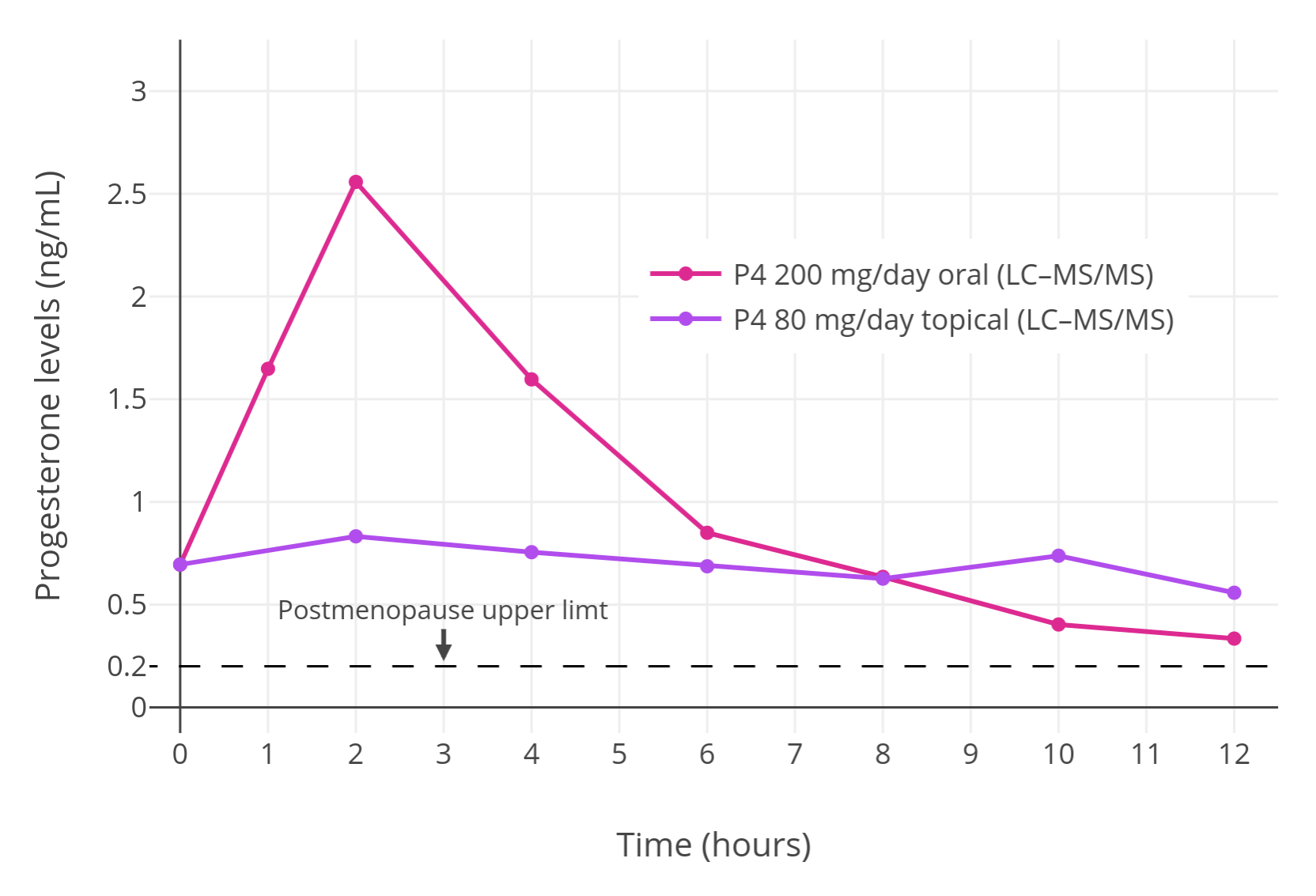
Progesterone levels measured via LC–MS/MS during treatment with 200 mg/day oral progesterone or over-the-counter 80 mg/day transdermal progesterone cream (Pro-Gest) in postmenopausal women.

The skin permeability of a compound is based on its physicochemical properties, particularly lipophilicity and hydrophilicity. In general, the more polar groups, for instance hydroxyl groups, that are present in a steroid, and hence the more hydrophilic and less lipophilic it is, the lower its skin permeability. For this reason, progesterone and estrone have higher skin permeability, estradiol has moderate skin permeability, and estriol and cortisol have lower skin permeability. The transdermal bioavailability of progesterone applied to the breasts is approximately 10%. This is roughly the same as that of the general transdermal absorption of estradiol and testosterone, although applied to other skin sites. The site of application of transdermal progesterone may influence its absorption. A study observed a significant increase in circulating levels of progesterone shortly after administration when it was applied as a transdermal ointment to the breasts but not when it was applied to other areas like the thigh or abdomen.

Whereas estradiol circulates at levels in the picomolar range (pg/mL), progesterone circulates at concentrations in the nanomolar range (ng/mL), and a relatively large dose is required to produce these levels. The body synthesizes about 25 mg of progesterone per day on average during the luteal phase. This relatively large quantity by weight has been claimed to require around 50% of the body to be used as a surface of absorption to deliver a similar quantity of progesterone on the basis of its absorption mechanics. As such, the transdermal route cannot easily achieve adequate circulating progesterone levels, and this makes transdermal progesterone impractical for systemic therapy. Clinical studies have found only very low circulating levels of progesterone with the use of transdermal progesterone, and these levels are thought to be insufficient to confer endometrial protection against estrogens. The range of circulating levels of progesterone that has been observed in clinical studies with various formulations and doses of transdermal progesterone is 0.38 to 3.5 ng/mL.

Although very low levels of progesterone have been observed in venous blood with transdermal progesterone, very high and in fact greatly supraphysiological levels of progesterone have unexpectedly been found in saliva and capillary blood. In one study, the levels of progesterone in saliva and capillary blood were 10- and 100-fold greater than levels in venous blood, respectively. Levels of salivary progesterone that have been observed have ranged from 2.9 to 2,840 ng/mL. The high salivary and capillary blood levels of progesterone suggest that despite low circulating levels of progesterone, systemic distribution of progesterone and considerable exposure of some tissues to the hormone may be occurring with transdermal progesterone somehow. However, the few clinical studies that have assessed the effects of transdermal progesterone on the endometrium have had mixed findings, and further research is needed to determine whether it can confer adequate endometrial protection as a component of menopausal hormone therapy.

Transdermal progesterone is usually supplied in the form of creams and water-based gels, and the studies in which very low levels of progesterone in circulation were observed with transdermal progesterone used these formulations. One study of 100 mg/day transdermal progesterone in the form of an alcohol-based gel found relatively high concentrations of progesterone in circulation that corresponded to luteal-phase levels. The peak levels of progesterone were 8 ng/mL and were theoretically sufficient to confer endometrial protection. These findings, although based on a single study, suggest that alcohol-based progesterone gels might yield relatively high levels of circulating progesterone. One possible explanation for the difference is that progesterone creams are more lipophilic and may have a preference for uptake into the fatty layer under the skin. Conversely, alcohol-based gels are more water-soluble and may rapidly distribute into the microcirculation of the skin and then into the general circulation. However, in another study that investigated the pharmacokinetics of transdermal progesterone using either a hydrophilic-, lipophilic-, or emulsion-type base, it was found that in all three cases that the time to peak concentrations was around 4 hours and the venous blood levels observed were very low.

==== High levels in saliva and capillary blood ====
On the basis of the very low levels of progesterone observed in venous blood with transdermal progesterone, some researchers have concluded that transdermal progesterone is not well-absorbed and will not allow for adequate endometrial protection. However, in spite of very low levels of progesterone in circulation, studies that have measured levels of progesterone in saliva and/or capillary blood with transdermal progesterone have found that they are dramatically elevated and in fact greatly supraphysiological. In one study that used an oil-based cream or water-based gel, salivary and fingertip capillary blood levels of progesterone were found to be approximately 10-fold and 100-fold greater than venous blood levels, respectively. The exact levels of progesterone were 4 to 12 ng/mL in saliva and 62 to 96 ng/mL in capillary blood; the reference ranges of progesterone in saliva and capillary blood from a cited laboratory were 0.75 to 2.5 ng/mL and 3.3 to 22.5 ng/mL for premenopausal women in the luteal phase and 0.12 to 1.0 ng/mL and 0.1 to 0.8 ng/mL in postmenopausal women, respectively. As such, these data confirm distribution of progesterone to at least certain tissues with transdermal progesterone in spite of very low levels of progesterone in circulation and indicate that progesterone levels in venous blood cannot necessarily be used as an index of tissue exposure to progesterone with this route of administration. These findings provide a possible explanation for how some studies found antiproliferative and atrophic changes in the endometrium with transdermal progesterone. However, elevated levels of progesterone in the endometrium with transdermal progesterone have yet to be demonstrated.

Concern has been raised regarding transdermal progesterone in that the effects of such supraphysiological levels of progesterone in tissues are unknown and hence the potential for adverse effects has not been ruled out. Salivary monitoring of progesterone levels in women using transdermal progesterone and adjustment of dosage as necessary has been suggested as a possible means to help prevent potential adverse effects.

The mechanism by which transdermal progesterone in cream and water-based gel produces very high salivary and capillary blood levels in spite of low circulating levels is not well-understood. However, at least two hypotheses have been proposed. Steroid hormones including progesterone have been found to be transported by red blood cells in addition to serum carrier proteins like albumin, sex hormone-binding globulin, and corticosteroid-binding globulin, and as much as 15 to 35% of total steroid hormone content in whole blood may be confined to red blood cells. According to the hypothesis, very high local concentrations of progesterone occur in skin capillaries after transdermal application and are taken up by red blood cells. The transit time of red blood cells from capillaries and the release of steroid hormones from red blood cells are both very rapid, so it is suggested that progesterone is delivered through circulation to tissues via red blood cells without having time to equilibrate with systemic blood. This could potentially explain the low levels of progesterone in venous blood in spite of very high levels in capillary blood and saliva. However, one study assessed progesterone levels in red blood cells with transdermal progesterone and found that they were significantly increased but still very low. Nonetheless, according to other authors, "[a]lthough the investigators of that study concluded that the progesterone levels in red blood cells were too low to be important in the delivery of progesterone to target tissues, it should be realized that even small amounts of progesterone taken up by red blood cells might be important because the transit time of red blood cells from capillaries is very rapid. [...] However, the role of red blood cells in steroid hormone transport has not been studied thoroughly, and such studies are warranted."

An in vitro study using porcine skin and several formulations of transdermal progesterone found that only minute quantities of progesterone penetrated through the skin but that there was significant partitioning of progesterone in the skin tissues. According to the researchers, the results suggested that lymphatic circulation in the skin might account for systemic distribution of transdermal progesterone.

==== Metabolism and elimination ====
5α-Reductase is a major enzyme involved in the metabolism of progesterone and is known to be expressed in skin in high amounts. For this reason, it has been suggested that rapid metabolism of progesterone by 5α-reductase could account for the low levels of circulating progesterone produced by transdermal application. Studies of progesterone have reported that when progesterone is administered transdermally, 80% is metabolized in the skin and only 20% is likely to pass the skin barrier. Along these lines, a study of radiolabeled progesterone found that 5β-reduced pregnanediol excretion was 8-fold higher than 5α-reduced allopregnanediol excretion with intravenous progesterone yet allopregnanediol excretion was slightly higher than pregnanediol excretion with transdermal progesterone. The metabolites of progesterone in the skin seem to have no hormonal activity. In addition to 5α-reductase, other enzymes, such as 20α-hydroxysteroid dehydrogenase, metabolize progesterone in the skin. Progesterone and/or its metabolites such as 5α-dihydroprogesterone act as 5α-reductase inhibitors and inhibitors of 3α- and 3β-hydroxysteroid dehydrogenases in the skin.

On the other hand, other research has cast doubt on the notion that progesterone is robustly metabolized in the skin. One study reported that transdermal progesterone in an alcohol-based gel produced high levels of circulating progesterone. This suggests that formulation rather than metabolism might be a critical limiting factor for the bioavailability of transdermal progesterone. A study assessed urinary levels of pregnanediol glucuronide, the major metabolite of progesterone in urine, and found that although circulating progesterone levels and urinary levels of pregnanediol glucuronide increased after treatment with transdermal progesterone, the levels of both nonetheless remained in the range of the follicular phase and hence were very low. A case report found that the 5α-reductase inhibitor finasteride did not increase the circulating progesterone levels or urinary pregnanediol glucuronide levels produced by transdermal progesterone. Likewise, a study found that the 5α-reductase inhibitor dutasteride resulted in only slightly higher progesterone levels with transdermal progesterone. Finally, 5α-reductase is also a major enzyme involved in the metabolism of testosterone, yet transdermal testosterone is approved for androgen replacement therapy and is very effective in raising testosterone levels.

In terms of elimination, a study that investigated the pharmacokinetics of transdermal progesterone using either a hydrophilic-, lipophilic-, or emulsion-type base found that in all three cases the elimination half-life was in the range of 30 to 40 hours.

==== Systemic clinical effectiveness ====
At least seven studies have assessed transdermal progesterone. In these studies, different formulations of transdermal progesterone including creams and water-based gels (brand names Pro-Gest, Progestelle, and Pro-Femme, as well as compounded) were used, with different sample sizes (n = 6 to n = 40), at different dosages (15 to 80 mg per day), and for different durations of treatment (1.4 to 24 weeks). Venous blood progesterone levels were assessed and reported in five of the studies and in all cases were low and found not to exceed 3.5 ng/mL. It is generally accepted that progesterone levels of 5 ng/mL are necessary to inhibit mitosis and induce secretory changes in the endometrium, although some researchers have been disputed this contention. Effects on the endometrium of transdermal progesterone were assessed in three of the studies via endometrial biopsy and the results were mixed. In one study, there was no effect; in another, antiproliferative effects were observed; and in the last study, an atrophic state was observed but only in 28 of 40 (70%) of the women. Circulating progesterone levels were reported as less than 3.5 ng/mL in the first study, low and widely variable in the second study, and were not given in the third study. Moreover, the duration of the study in which no effect was observed was short at only 2 weeks, and a longer treatment period of 4 to 6 weeks is necessary to produce endometrial changes. It has also been suggested that the dosage of estrogen used may have been insufficient to allow for proper priming of the endometrium for progesterone to act. Taken together, further studies are required to adequately establish a protective effect of transdermal progesterone on the endometrium.

==== Local application to the breasts ====
Transdermal application of progesterone with the intention of systemic therapy should not be equated with local treatment. The site of application of transdermal progesterone has been found to significantly influence its absorption. When transdermal progesterone is applied to the breasts, high concentrations within breast tissue have been observed. In one study, a 3- to 5-fold increase in local progesterone levels in the breast was observed with 50 mg transdermal progesterone in an alcohol/water-based gel applied to each breast in premenopausal women. In another study, a 70- to 110-fold increase in local concentrations of progesterone in the breasts was measured with application of a hydroalcoholic gel to the breasts in premenopausal women. A study observed a significant increase in circulating levels of progesterone when it was applied as a topical ointment to the breasts but not when it was applied to other areas like the thigh or abdomen. However, two other studies observed no apparent increase in circulating levels of progesterone with transdermal application of progesterone to the breasts. On the basis of its 10% transdermal bioavailability when applied to the breasts, a 50 mg dose of progesterone applied transdermally may result in a local concentration of progesterone in the breasts equivalent to 5 mg.

While transdermal progesterone is not approved for use in menopausal hormone therapy or as a systemic medication, it is registered in some countries under the brand name Progestogel as a 1% gel (10 mg/g) for direct local application to the breasts to treat premenstrual breast pain. The medication has been found in clinical studies to inhibit estrogen-induced proliferation of breast epithelial cells, to be highly effective in the treatment of benign breast disease, to significantly decrease breast nodularity, and to almost completely alleviate breast pain and tenderness in women with the condition. Conversely, transdermal progesterone has been found to be almost completely ineffective in fibrocystic breast disease, breast cysts, and breast fibroadenomas, whereas oral progestins were found to be significantly effective. The effectiveness of progesterone and other progestogens in the treatment of breast disorders may be due to their functional antiestrogenic effects in the breasts.

=== Vaginal administration ===
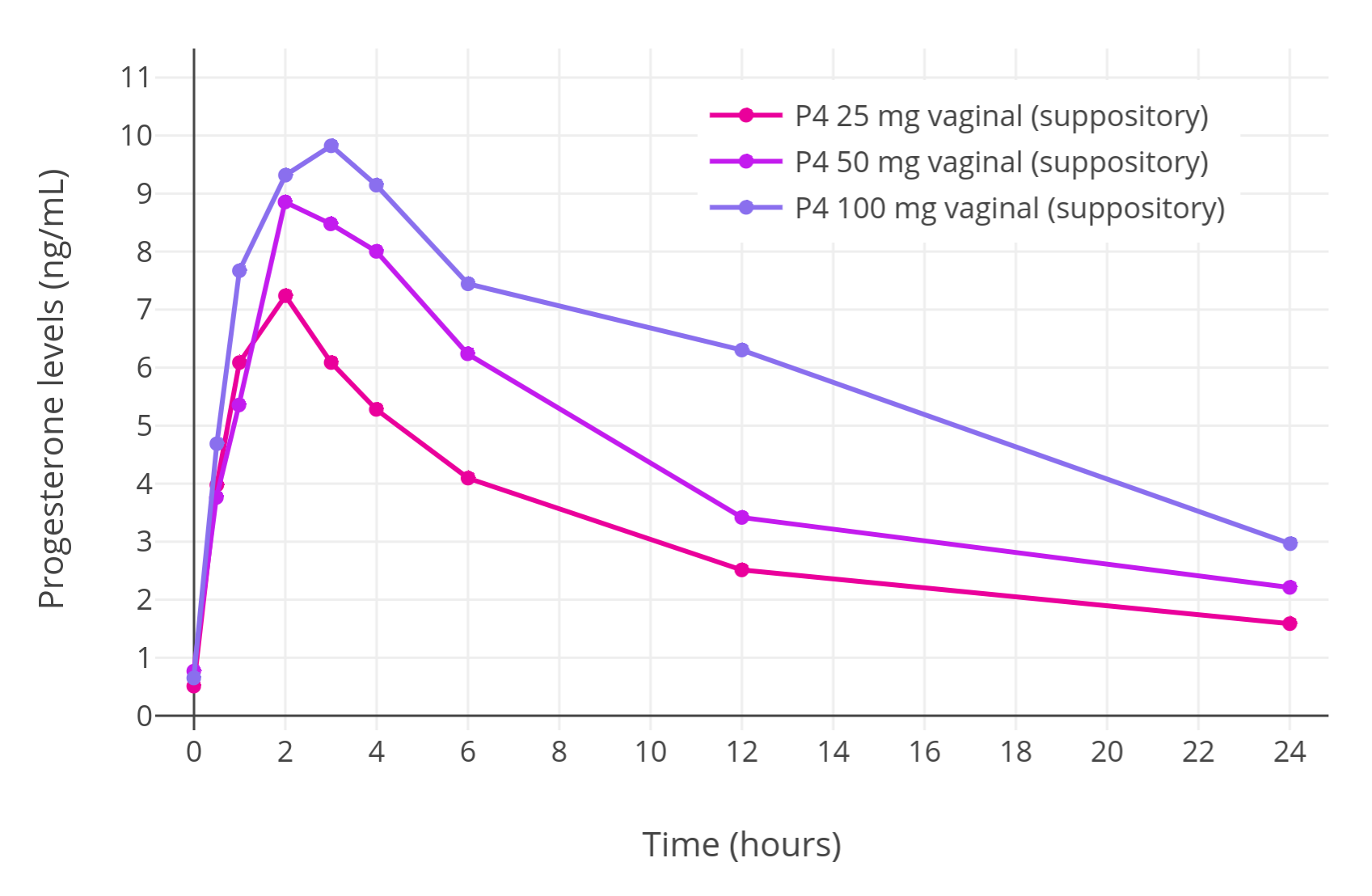
Progesterone levels after a single 25, 50, or 100 mg vaginal progesterone suppository in ovulating premenopausal women.

Progesterone is available for vaginal administration in the form of capsules (Utrogestan), gels (Crinone, Prochieve), suppositories (Cyclogest), inserts/tablets (Endometrin, Lutinus), and rings (Fertiring, Progering). In addition, oral micronized progesterone capsules have been administered vaginally with success.

The bioavailability of vaginal micronized progesterone insert is about 4 to 8%. Vaginal absorption of progesterone is lower in postmenopausal women with vaginal atrophy. Following administration of a single 25, 50, or 100 mg vaginal progesterone suppository in women, maximal circulating levels of progesterone occurred within 2 to 3 hours and were 7.27 ± 2.8 ng/mL, 8.84 ± 3.14 ng/mL, and 9.82 ± 9.8 ng/mL, respectively. After peak levels, progesterone levels decreased gradually, with an elimination half-life of 6 to 12 hours. Progesterone levels were less than 3 ng/mL for all three doses after 24 hours. The researchers concluded that the 25 and 50 mg doses would be appropriate for administration three times per day while the 100 mg dose would be appropriate for administration twice per day.

The bioavailability of vaginal progesterone gel is about 40-fold greater than that of oral progesterone. Gel bioavailability does not seem to vary between the "Crinone 8%" formulation and two experimental generic formulations of different strengths, peaking at about 10 ng/mL after 90 mg of gel within 7 hours (with a large standard deviation). There is no precise pharmacokinetics data for vaginal gel compared to intramuscular standard, though it is understood to be less powerful for a number of indications compared to IM.

There is a uterine first-pass effect with vaginal progesterone, such that progesterone levels are far greater in the uterus than in the circulation. Full secretory transformation of the endometrium was produced by vaginal progesterone administration that resulted in circulating progesterone levels of 1 to 3 ng/mL, whereas other parenteral routes (intramuscular and intranasal) were less effective in comparison. The difference can be attributed to the endometrial first-pass effect with vaginal progesterone.

=== Rectal administration ===
Progesterone can be taken by rectal administration. A suppository sold under the brand name Cyclogest is indicated for rectal use in addition to the vaginal route. Daily rectal administration of progesterone is inconvenient and poorly accepted for long-term therapy. Nonetheless, rectal progesterone can be a useful alternative to the vaginal route in the context of vaginal infection, cystitis, recent childbirth, or when barrier contraception methods are used.

A number of studies have assessed progesterone by the rectal route. Levels of progesterone following rectal administration have been found to be 6.4 ng/mL after a single 25 mg suppository, 22.5 ng/mL after a single 100 mg suppository, and 20.0 ng/mL after a single 200 mg suppository. The absorption of the rectal route is variable, with a wide range of maximal concentrations of 15 to 52 ng/mL progesterone after a single rectal dose of 100 mg progesterone. Levels of progesterone peak after 6 to 8 hours and then gradually decrease. Progesterone levels have been found to be similar and non-significantly different after administration of rectal and vaginal suppositories in several studies.

Progesterone is delivered directly into the circulation when it is absorbed by the lower portion of the rectum and transported by the inferior and middle rectal veins. Conversely, if it is absorbed by the upper portion of the rectum, progesterone is subject to hepatic first-pass metabolism due to entry into the hepatic portal system via the superior rectal vein. As such, although rectal administration is a parenteral route, it may still be subject to some first-pass metabolism similarly to oral progesterone.

Hormone levels with rectal progesterone
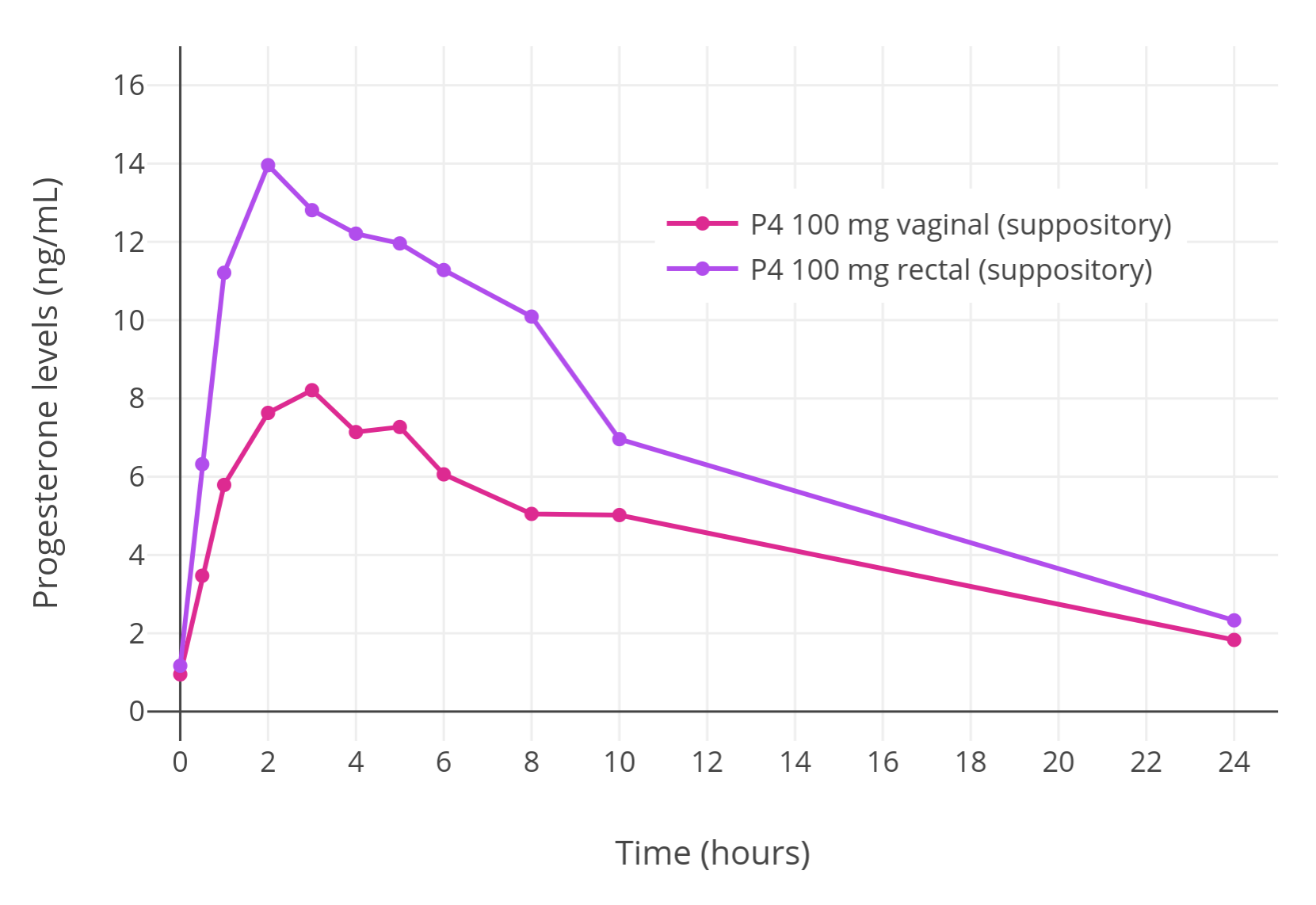
Progesterone levels with vaginal or rectal administration of a suppository containing 100 mg progesterone (P4) in women.

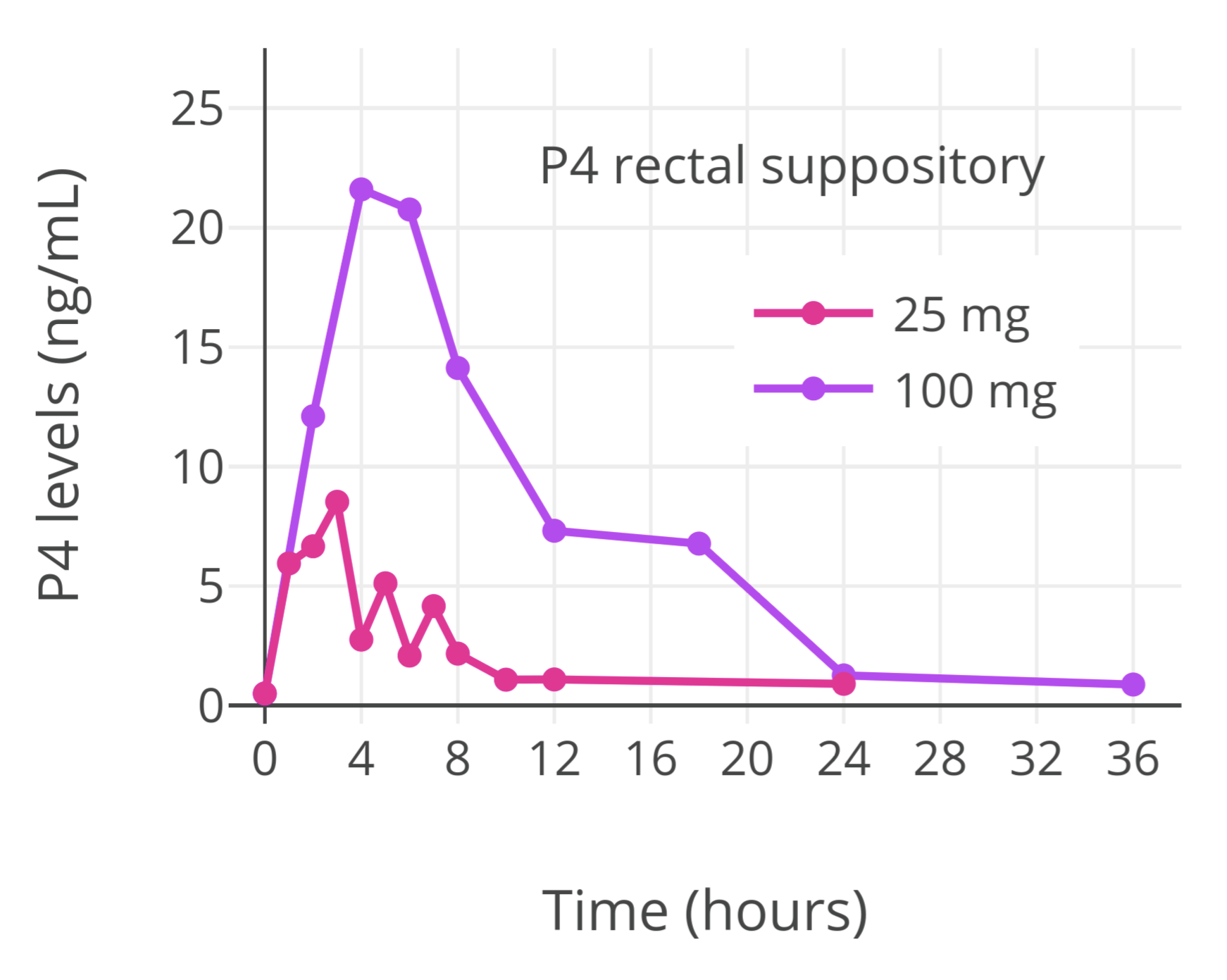
Progesterone levels with rectal administration of a suppository containing 25 or 100 mg progesterone (P4) in women.

=== Intramuscular injection ===
Parenteral potencies and durations of progestogens (Note: Sources:) (Note: All given by intramuscular or subcutaneous injection.)
Compound	Form	Dose for specific uses (mg) (Note: Progesterone production during the luteal phase is ~25 (15–50) mg/day. The OID of OHPC is 250 to 500 mg/month.)			DOA (Note: Duration of action in days.)
Compound	Form	TFD (Note: Usually given for 14 days.)	POICD (Note: Usually dosed every two to three months.)	CICD (Note: Usually dosed once monthly.)	DOA
Algestone acetophenide	Oil soln.	–	–	75–150	14–32 d
Gestonorone caproate	Oil soln.	25–50	–	–	8–13 d
Hydroxyprogest. acetate (Note: Never marketed or approved by this route.)	Aq. susp.	350	–	–	9–16 d
Hydroxyprogest. caproate	Oil soln.	250–500 (Note: In divided doses (2 × 125 or 250 mg for OHPC, 10 × 20 mg for P4).)	–	250–500	5–21 d
Medroxyprog. acetate	Aq. susp.	50–100	150	25	14–50+ d
Megestrol acetate	Aq. susp.	–	–	25	>14 d
Norethisterone enanthate	Oil soln.	100–200	200	50	11–52 d
Progesterone	Oil soln.	200	–	–	2–6 d
Progesterone	Aq. soln.	?	–	–	1–2 d
Progesterone	Aq. susp.	50–200	–	–	7–14 d
Notes and sources:

==== Oil solutions ====
When used by intramuscular injection, progesterone bypasses first-pass metabolism in the intestines and liver and achieves very high circulating progesterone levels. Levels of progesterone with 100 mg/day intramuscular progesterone were substantially higher than with 800 mg/day vaginal progesterone (about 70 ng/mL and 12 ng/mL, respectively), although local progesterone levels in the uterus were 10 times higher with the vaginal route due to a uterine first-pass effect (around 1.5 ng/mL and almost 12 ng/mL, respectively). The duration of progesterone is extended by the intramuscular route due to a depot effect in which it is stored locally in adipose tissue, and can be administered once every 1 to 3 days. The half-life of intramuscular progesterone is significantly longer when it is injected into the gluteal muscles of the buttocks rather than the deltoid muscle of the upper arm. Intramuscular progesterone has traditionally been the most popular form of progesterone used for luteal support in assisted reproduction in the United States, although vaginal progesterone is also used and effective.

With intramuscular injection of 10 mg progesterone in vegetable oil, maximum plasma concentrations (C_{max}) are reached at approximately 8 hours after administration, and serum levels remain above baseline for about 24 hours. Doses of 10, 25, and 50 mg via intramuscular injection have been found to result in average maximal concentrations of 7, 28, and 50 ng/mL, respectively. With intramuscular injection, a dose of 25 mg results in normal luteal phase serum levels of progesterone within 8 hours, and a 100 mg dose produces mid-pregnancy levels of 40 to 80 ng/mL at peak. At these doses, levels of progesterone remain elevated above baseline for at least 48 hours (6 ng/mL at this point for 100 mg), with an elimination half-life of about 22 hours.

Due to the high concentrations achieved, progesterone by intramuscular injection at the usual clinical dose range is able to suppress gonadotropin secretion from the pituitary gland, demonstrating antigonadotropic efficacy (and therefore suppression of gonadal sex steroid production).

Intramuscular progesterone often causes pain when injected. It irritates tissues and is associated with injection site reactions such as changes in skin color, pain, redness, transient indurations (due to inflammation), ecchymosis (bruising/discoloration), and others. Rarely, sterile abscesses can occur. Large doses of progesterone by intramuscular injection, for instance 100 mg, are associated with moderate-to-severe injection site reactions.

==== Aqueous suspensions ====
Progesterone has been found to have a considerably longer duration of action by intramuscular injection when administered in the form of a microcrystalline aqueous suspension (crystal sizes of 0.02–0.1 mm) than as an oil solution. Whereas a single intramuscular injection of 25 to 350 mg progesterone in oil solution has a duration of 2 to 6 days in terms of clinical biological effect in the uterus in women, a single intramuscular injection of 50 to 300 mg microcrystalline progesterone in aqueous suspension has a duration of 7 to 14 days. As a result, intramuscular progesterone in oil solution is given once every 1 to 3 days at typical clinical doses, whereas intramuscular microcrystalline progesterone in aqueous suspension can be given once weekly or at even longer intervals. The duration of microcrystalline aqueous suspensions is dependent both on drug concentration and on crystal size. A larger needle size is needed for aqueous suspensions of steroids to allow the crystals to pass through the needle lumen. A 20- or 21-gauge needle has been reported to be suitable for the injection of aqueous suspensions of microcrystalline progesterone.

Formulations of microcrystalline progesterone in aqueous suspension for long-lasting depot use via intramuscular injection were on the market in the 1950s under a variety of brand names including Flavolutan, Luteosan, Lutocyclin M, and Lutren. Another preparation is Agolutin Depot, which was introduced by 1960 and appears to remain marketed in the Czech Republic and Slovakia today. Sistocyclin was the brand name of a product containing 10 mg microcrystalline estradiol benzoate and 200 mg microcrystalline progesterone in an aqueous suspension which was marketed in the 1950s. The medication was reported to have a duration of action of 10 to 12 days in terms of the progestogen component, relative to a duration of only 2 days for estradiol benzoate and progesterone in oil solution. Unfortunately, intramuscular injections of aqueous suspensions of progesterone and other steroids is painful, often severely so. As a result, they were largely discontinued in favor of other preparations, such as progesterone in oil solution and longer-acting progestins.

Progesterone in aqueous suspensions by intramuscular injection appears to be more potent in terms of progestogenic effects than progesterone in oil solutions by intramuscular injection. Whereas 25 mg doses of progesterone as microcrystals were needed to induce decidualization in women, doses of 35 to 50 mg were needed of progesterone in oil. This was attributed to the steadier and longer-lasting progesterone levels with aqueous suspensions relative to oil solutions.

Medroxyprogesterone acetate (brand names Depo-Provera, Depo-SubQ Provera 104), a progestin and structural modification of progesterone with a methyl group at the C6α position and an acetoxy group at the C17α position, is formulated as a microcrystalline aqueous suspension for use by intramuscular or subcutaneous injection. As with progesterone, the formulation of medroxyprogesterone acetate in this way dramatically extends its duration. It has a duration of 16 to 50 days at a dose of 50 mg, while its duration with a 150 mg dose is at least 3 months and as long as 6 to 9 months.

==== Emulsions ====
Water-in-oil emulsions of steroids were studied in the late 1940s and in the 1950s. Long-acting emulsions of progesterone were introduced for use by intramuscular injection alone under the brand name Progestin and with estradiol benzoate under the brand name Di-Pro-Emulsion by the 1950s. Steroid emulsions by intramuscular injection are reported to have similar properties, such as duration, as aqueous suspensions.

==== Microspheres ====
An aqueous suspension of progesterone encapsulated in microspheres is marketed for use by intramuscular injection under the brand name ProSphere in Mexico. It is administered once weekly or once monthly, depending on the indication. For instance, the medication is administered at a dose of 100 to 300 mg by intramuscular injection once every 7 days for the treatment of threatened miscarriage. The microspheres range in size from 33 to 75 μg and are delivered using pre-filled syringes with a 20-gauge 38 mm needle. Peak levels of progesterone after a single 100 or 200 mg intramuscular injection of ProSphere occur after about 1.5 days. The elimination half-life of progesterone with this formulation is about 8 days. A single 200 mg intramuscular injection maintains progesterone levels of more than 10 ng/mL for 5 to 7 days. ProSphere is well tolerated in terms of injection site reactions.

A combination of both estradiol and progesterone encapsulated within microspheres as an aqueous suspension for use by intramuscular injection has been marketed under the brand name Juvenum in Mexico. Studies of this formulation have been published.

Estradiol and progesterone encapsulated in microspheres has been studied for use as a once-a-month combined injectable contraceptive but has not been further developed nor introduced for medical use.

==== Gallery ====
Hormone levels with progesterone by intramuscular injection
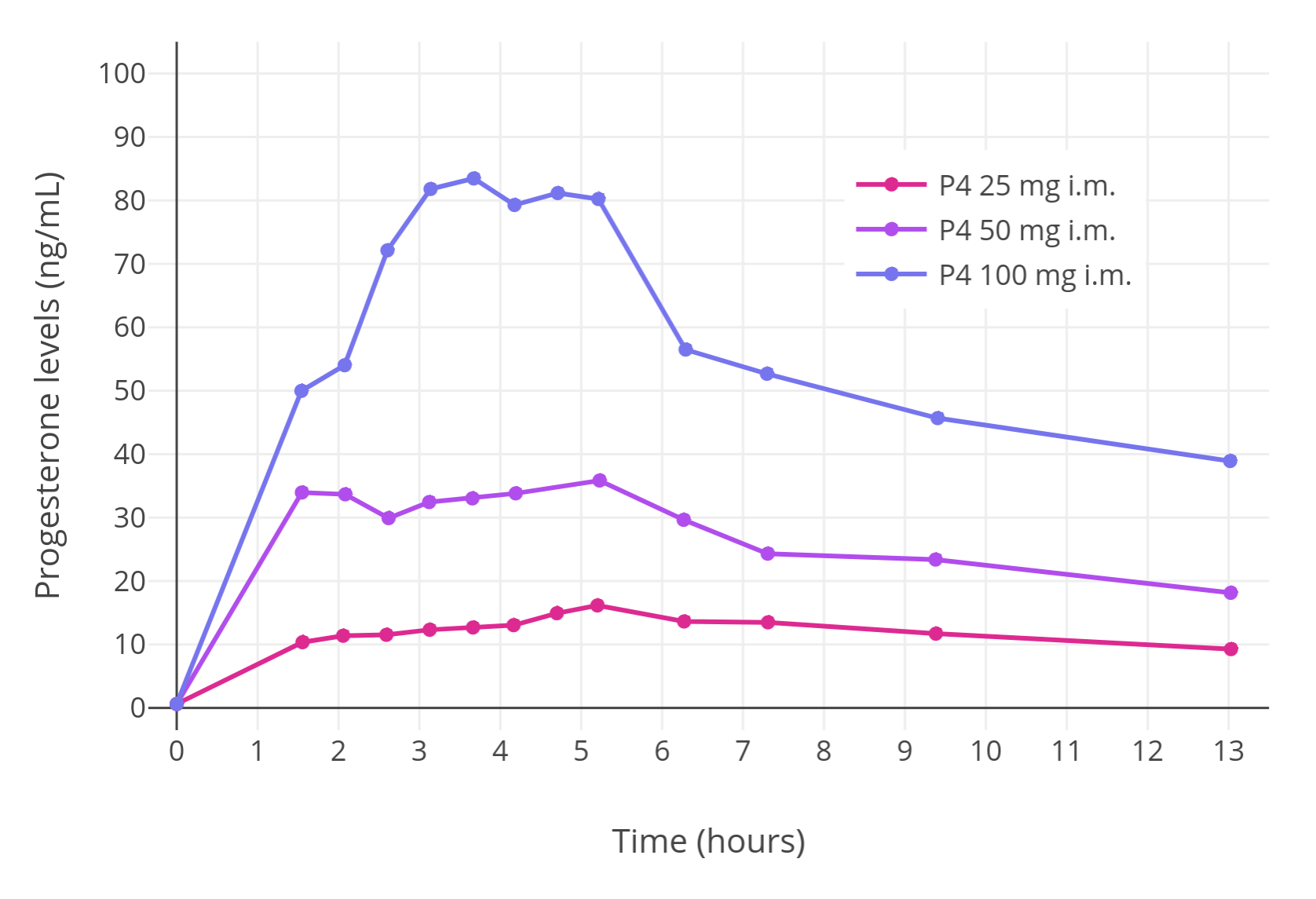
Progesterone levels with a single intramuscular injection of 25, 50, or 100 mg progesterone (P4) in oil solution in postmenopausal women.

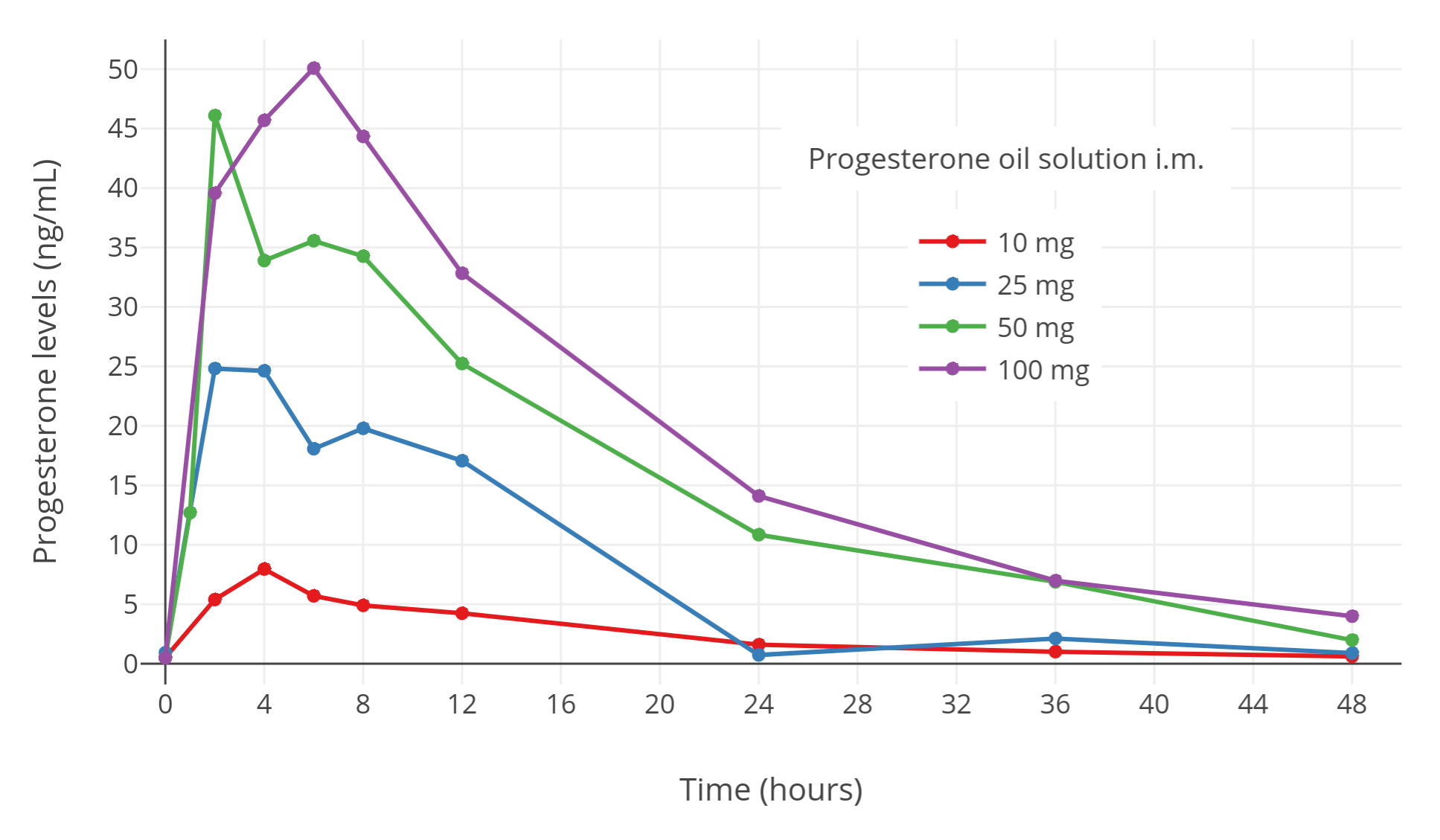
Progesterone levels with a single intramuscular injection of 10, 25, 50, or 100 mg progesterone in oil solution in women.

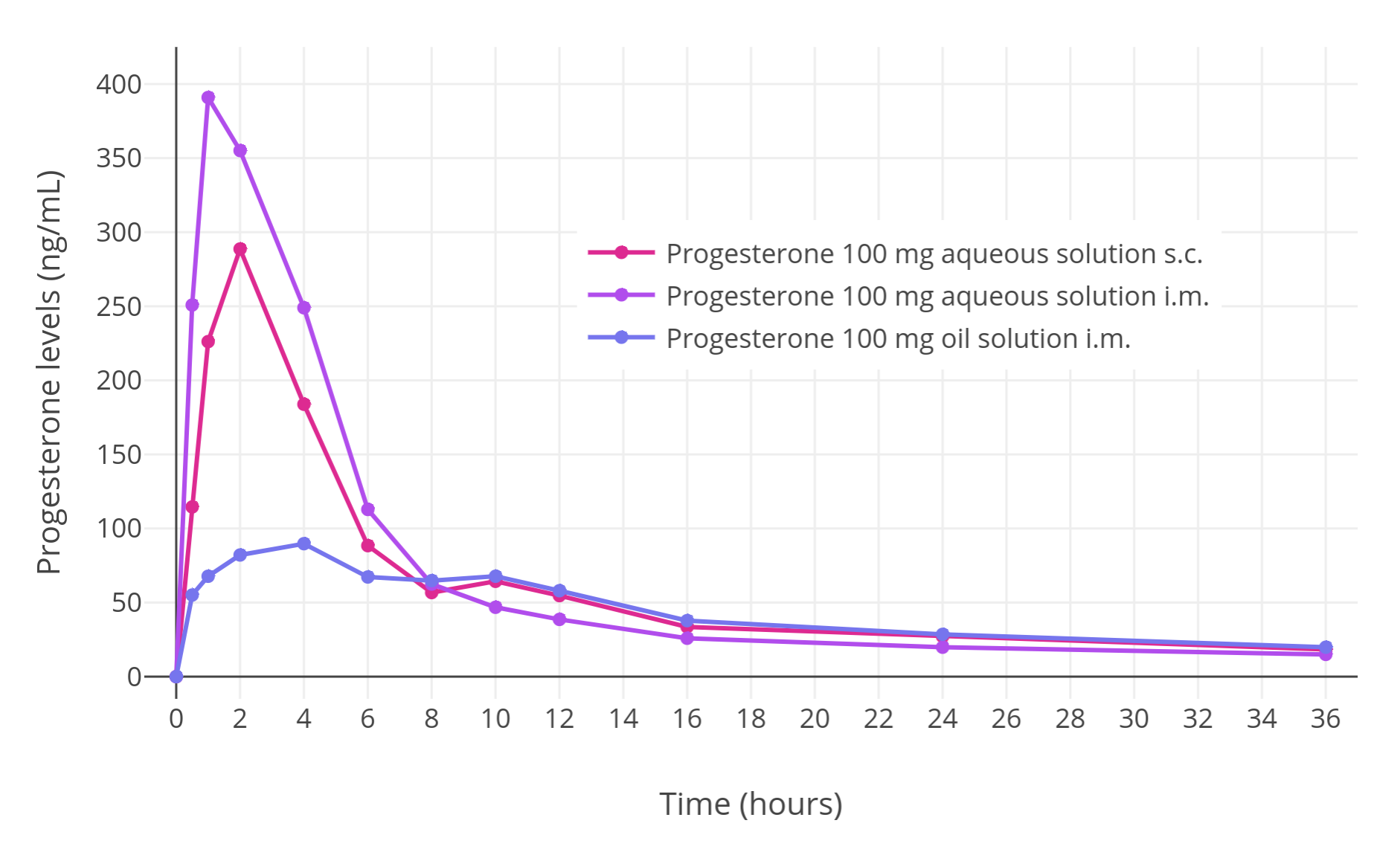
Progesterone levels following a single intramuscular or subcutaneous injection of 100 mg progesterone in an aqueous solution (Prolutex) or oil solution (Prontogest) in postmenopausal women.

=== Subcutaneous injection ===
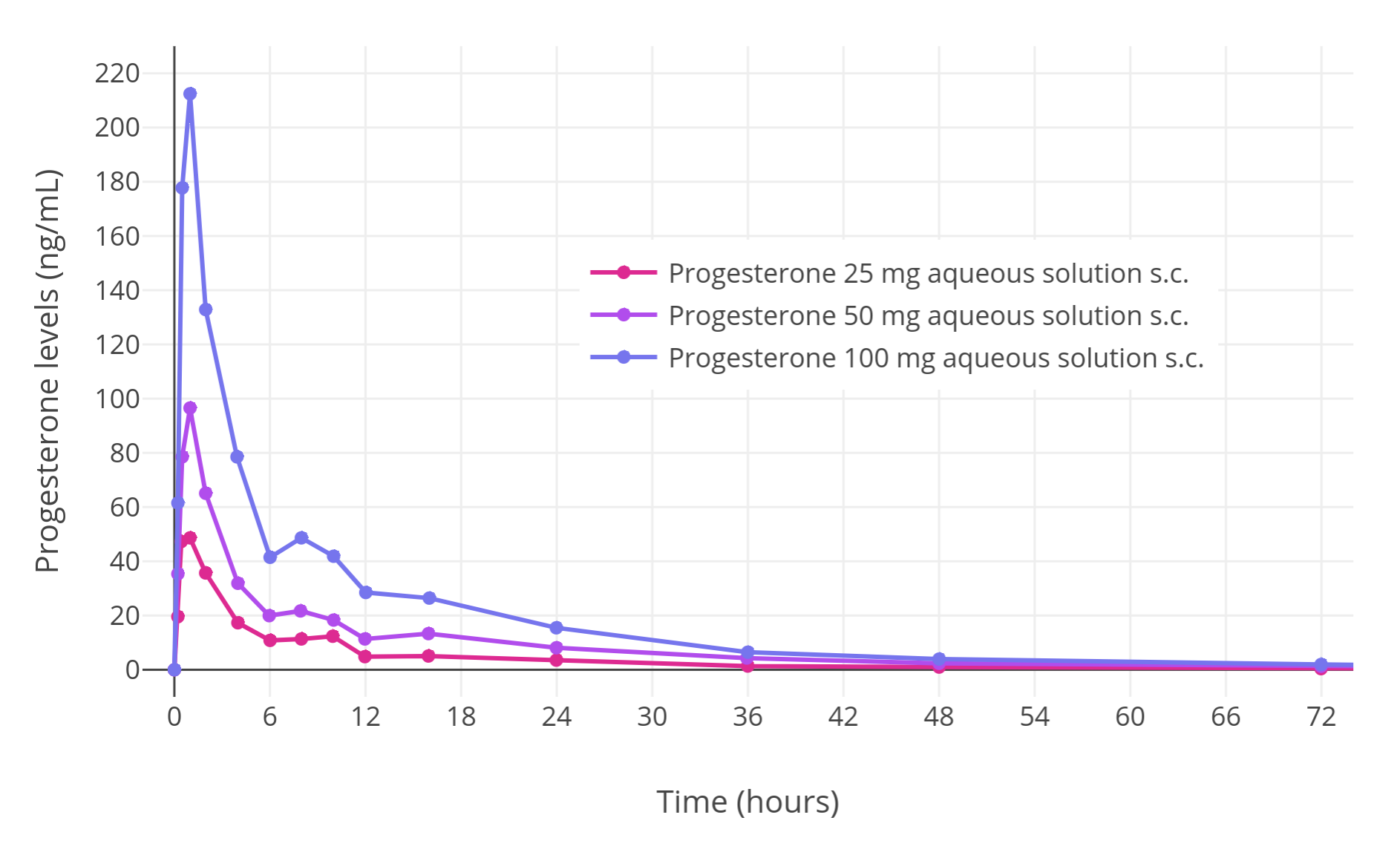
Progesterone levels following a single intramuscular injection of 25, 50, or 100 mg progesterone complexed with β-cyclodextrin in an aqueous solution (Prolutex) in postmenopausal women.

Progesterone can be administered by subcutaneous injection, with Prolutex, an aqueous solution of progesterone marketed in Europe, being intended for once-daily administration by this route. This formulation is rapidly absorbed and has been found to result in higher peak levels of progesterone relative to progesterone in oil solution by intramuscular injection. In addition, subcutaneous injection of progesterone is considered to be easier, safer due less risk of injection site reactions, and less painful compared to intramuscular injection of progesterone. The elimination half-life of this formulation is 13 to 18 hours, compared to 20 to 28 hours for intramuscular injection of progesterone in oil solution.

=== Subcutaneous implantation ===
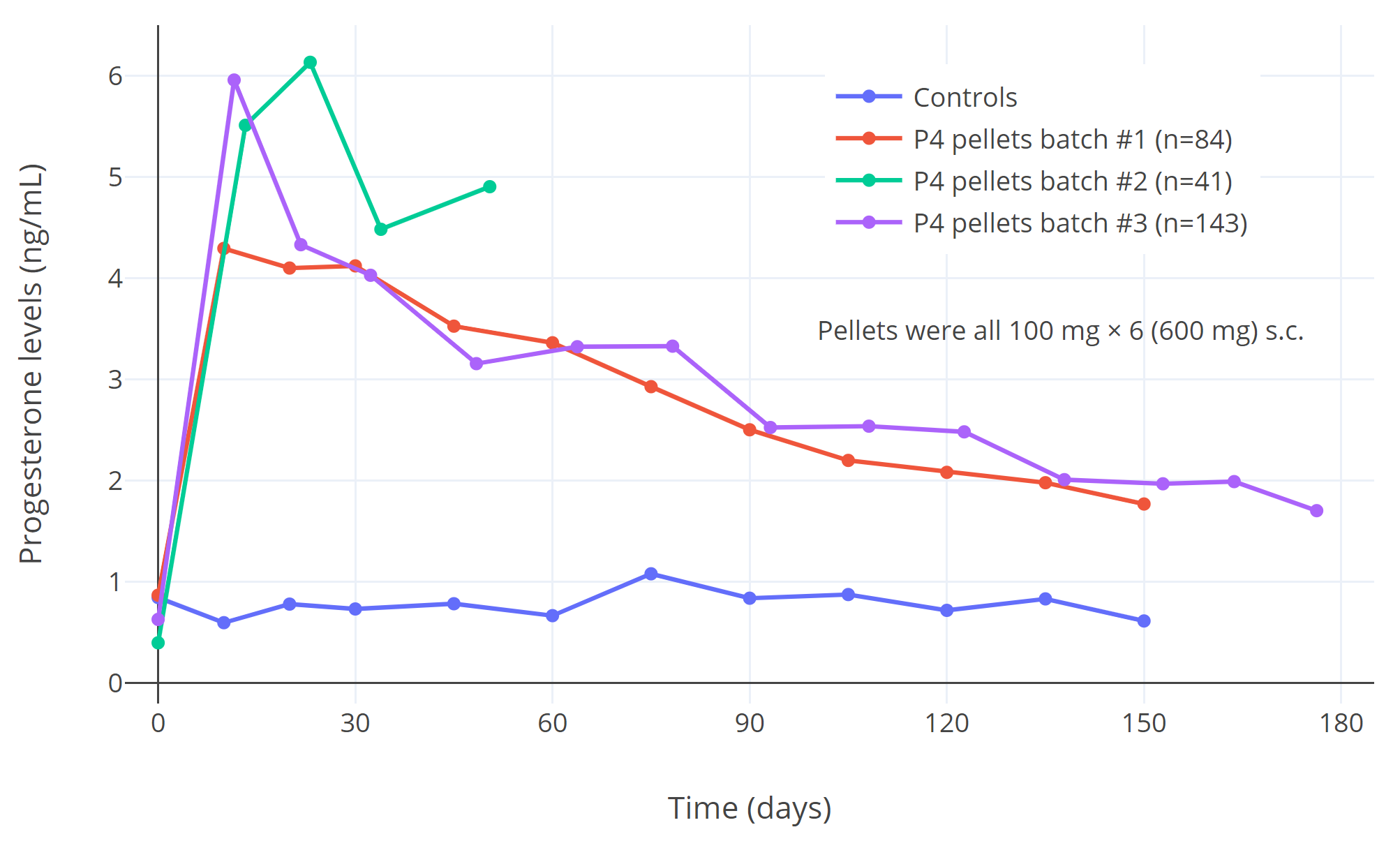
Progesterone levels in untreated women (controls) and with different batches of pure crystalline progesterone pellets (100 mg per pellet, 6 pellets = 600 mg total per subject) implanted subcutaneously in the gluteal region in women. The different batches were made with different manufacturing processes.

Progesterone was previously marketed in the 1950s and 1960s in the form of 50 and 100 mg subcutaneous pellet implants under the brand names Flavolutan, Luteosid, Lutocyclin, and Proluton. However, in contrast to estradiol and testosterone implants, which remain available as pharmaceutical products today, progesterone implant products have been discontinued and appear to no longer be available pharmaceutically. Progesterone implants may be available from some compounding pharmacies however, although such products are not regulated for quality or effectiveness.

Early studies of progesterone implants in humans were conducted in the 1930s to 1950s. Subcutaneous implants of progesterone were found to be poorly tolerated, with sterile abscesses and extrusion occurring in 15 to 20% of implantations. However, a study found that different manufacturing processes gave different rates of extrusion. Progesterone implants were also studied as a form of long-lasting hormonal birth control in women in the 1980s, but ultimately were never marketed. Implantation of six pellets containing 100 mg progesterone each (600 mg total) has been found to result in relatively low mean progesterone levels of about 3 ng/mL, with progesterone levels sustained for about five months. Subcutaneous implantation of progesterone has been studied in animals as well. Subcutaneous pellet implants are most practical when the medication is active at very low doses.

Although progesterone implants are not available as pharmaceutical preparations, subcutaneous implants of progestins, such as etonogestrel (Implanon/Nexplanon) and levonorgestrel (Jadelle/Norplant), are available as pharmaceutical products. They are used as forms of long-lasting hormonal birth control.

=== Intrauterine administration ===
A one-year progesterone intrauterine device (IUD) for hormonal birth control was previously available in the United States and a few other countries under the brand name Progestasert. It was marketed between 1976 and 2001. The IUD was never widely used due to a relatively high contraceptive failure rate of 2.9% and the requirement of annual replacement. It contained 38 mg progesterone and released 65 μg progesterone into the uterus per day (totaling up to about 35 mg after one year). For comparison, a woman's body produces on average about 25 mg progesterone per day during the luteal phase. While effective as a form of contraception and for decreasing menstrual bleeding and discomfort, long-lived IUDs can fundamentally only deliver small amounts of progesterone per day, and hence intrauterine progesterone cannot achieve adequate circulating progesterone levels and is unsuitable as a form of systemic therapy. Aside from progesterone, IUDs of progestins, such as levonorgestrel (Mirena/Levosert/Skyla), are available as well.

=== Intravenous injection ===
Progesterone has a very short elimination half-life of about 3 to 90 minutes when given by intravenous injection.

An aqueous solution of progesterone for use by intravenous injection was once marketed by Schering AG under the brand name Primolut Intravenous.

== General ==
=== Absorption ===
The absorption of progesterone varies depending on the route of administration.

=== Distribution ===
Progesterone crosses the blood–brain barrier. In terms of plasma protein binding, progesterone is 98 to 99% protein-bound in the circulation. It is bound 80% to albumin, 18% to corticosteroid-binding globulin, and less than 1% to sex hormone-binding globulin, with the remaining fraction of 1 to 2% circulating freely or unbound.

=== Metabolism ===
With oral administration, progesterone is rapidly metabolized in the gastrointestinal tract and liver. As many as 30 different metabolites have been found to be formed from progesterone with oral ingestion. Regardless of the route of administration, 5α-reductase is the major enzyme involved in the metabolism of progesterone and is responsible for approximately 60 to 65% of its metabolism. 5β-Reductase is also a major enzyme in the metabolism of progesterone. 5α-Reduction of progesterone occurs predominantly in the intestines (specifically the duodenum), whereas 5β-reduction occurs almost exclusively in the liver. The metabolites of progesterone produced by 5α-reductase and 5β-reductase (after further transformation by 3α-hydroxysteroid dehydrogenase) are allopregnanolone and pregnanolone, respectively. With oral administration of progesterone, they occur in circulation at very high and in fact supraphysiological concentrations that are well in excess of those of progesterone itself (peak concentrations of 30 ng/mL for allopregnanolone and 60 ng/mL for pregnanolone versus 12 ng/mL for progesterone at 4 hours after a single 200-mg oral dose of progesterone). In one study, a single 200-mg oral dose of progesterone resulted in peak levels of 20α-dihydroprogesterone of around 1 ng/mL after 2 hours.

The percentage constitutions of progesterone and its metabolites as reflected in serum levels have been determined for a single 100 mg dose of oral or vaginal progesterone. With oral administration, progesterone accounts for less than 20% of the dose in circulation while 5α- and 5β-reduced products like allopregnanolone and pregnanolone account for around 80%. With vaginal administration, progesterone accounts for around 50% of the dose and 5α- and 5β-reduced metabolites for around 40%.

A small amount of progesterone is converted by 21-hydroxylase into 11-deoxycorticosterone. Increases in levels of 11-deoxycorticosterone are markedly higher when progesterone is given orally as opposed to via parenteral routes like vaginal or intramuscular injection. The conversion of progesterone into 11-deoxycorticosterone occurs in the intestines (specifically the duodenum) and in the kidneys. 21-Hydroxylase appears to be absent in the liver, so conversion of progesterone into 11-deoxycorticosterone is thought not to occur in this part of the body.

Endogenous progesterone is metabolized approximately 50% into 5α-dihydroprogesterone in the corpus luteum, 35% into 3β-dihydroprogesterone in the liver, and 10% into 20α-dihydroprogesterone.

Metabolites of progesterone with one or more available hydroxyl groups are conjugated via glucuronidation and/or sulfation and excreted.

The biological half-life of progesterone in the circulation is very short; with intravenous injection, its half-life has ranged widely from 3 to 90 minutes in various studies. The metabolic clearance rate of progesterone ranges between 2,100 and 2,800 L/day, and is constant across the menstrual cycle.

Metabolism of progesterone in humans
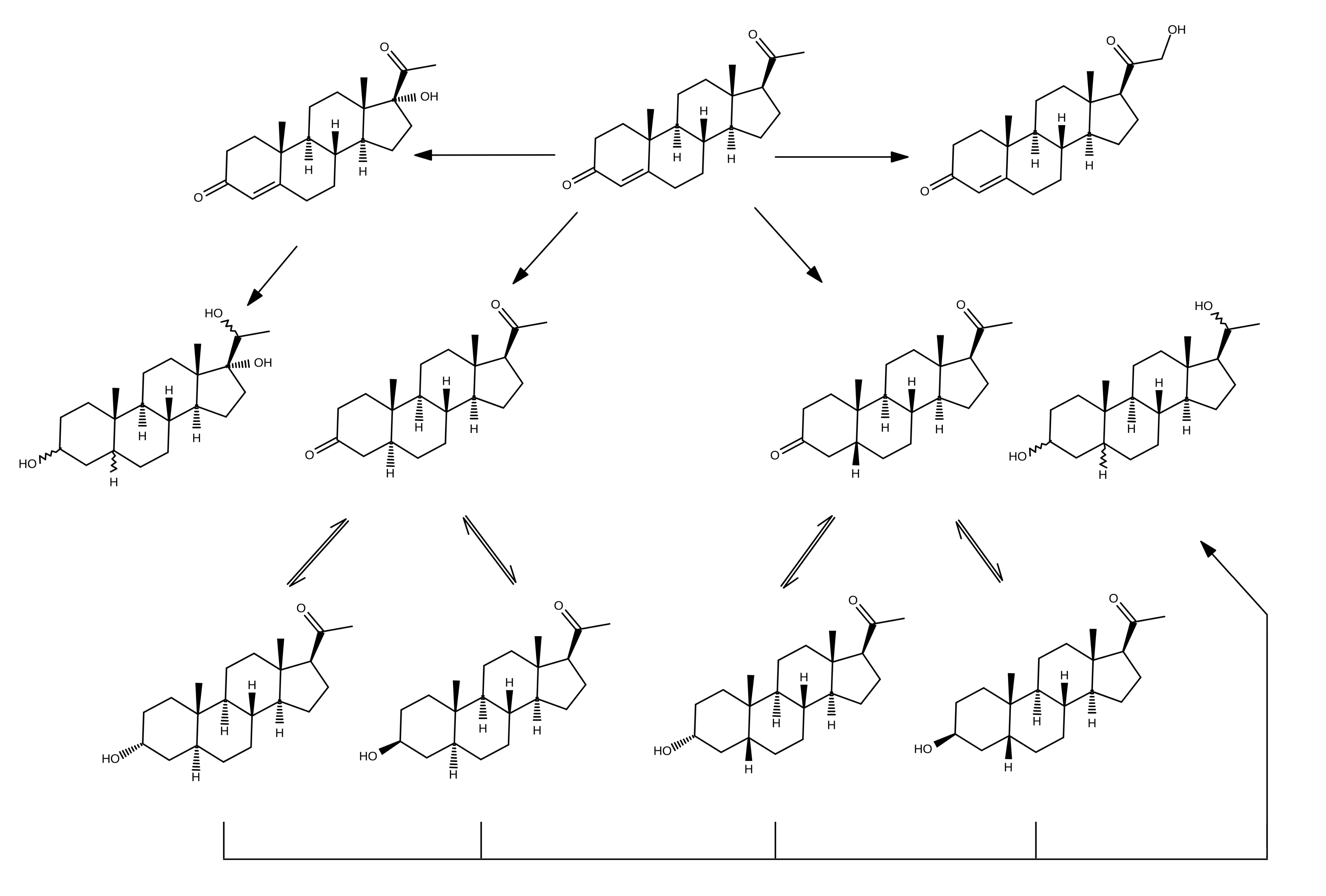
This diagram illustrates the metabolic pathways involved in the metabolism of progesterone in humans. In addition to the transformations shown in the diagram, conjugation, specifically glucuronidation and sulfation, occurs with metabolites of progesterone that have one or more available hydroxyl (–OH) groups.

=== Elimination ===
Progesterone is eliminated in bile and urine.

== See also ==
- Pharmacodynamics of progesterone
- Pharmacokinetics of estradiol
- Pharmacodynamics of estradiol
- Pharmacokinetics of testosterone
