= 20β-Dihydroprogesterone =

Names
- IUPAC name (20R)-20-Hydroxypregn-4-en-3-one
- Systematic IUPAC name (1S,3aS,3bS,9aR,9bS,11aS)-1-[(1R)-1-Hydroxyethyl]-9a,11a-dimethyl-1,2,3,3a,3b,4,5,8,9,9a,9b,10,11,11a-tetradecahydro-7H-cyclopenta[a]phenanthren-7-one
- Other names 20β-DHP; 20β-Hydroxyprogesterone; 20β-OHP; 20β-Progesterol; 20β-Progerol; 20β-Hydroxypregn-4-en-3-one; Pregn-4-en-20β-ol-3-one

Identifiers
CAS Number	145-15-3
3D model (JSmol)	Interactive image
ChEBI	CHEBI:36729
ChEMBL	ChEMBL2112756
ChemSpider	8612
ECHA InfoCard	100.005.137
PubChem CID	92747
UNII	67N4JZ6CHL
CompTox Dashboard (EPA)	DTXSID001314014
- InChI: InChI=1S/C21H32O2/c1-13(22)17-6-7-18-16-5-4-14-12-15(23)8-10-20(14,2)19(16)9-11-21(17,18)3/h12-13,16-19,22H,4-11H2,1-3H3/t13-,16+,17-,18+,19+,20+,21-/m1/s1 Key: RWBRUCCWZPSBFC-SJOKZOANSA-N
- SMILES: C[C@H]([C@H]1CC[C@@H]2[C@@]1(CC[C@H]3[C@H]2CCC4=CC(=O)CC[C@]34C)C)O

Properties
Chemical formula	C_{21}H_{32}O_{2}
Molar mass	316.485 g/mol
- Except where otherwise noted, data are given for materials in their standard state (at 25 °C [77 °F], 100 kPa). Infobox references

20β-Dihydroprogesterone (20β-DHP), also known as 20β-hydroxyprogesterone (20β-OHP), is an endogenous metabolite of progesterone which is formed by 20β-hydroxysteroid dehydrogenase (20β-HSD). It is a progestogen similarly to progesterone, with about 20 to 50% of the progestogenic activity of progesterone. It can be converted by 20β-HSD into progesterone in the uterus. The effects of 20β-HSD on the uterus, mammary glands, and in maintaining pregnancy have been studied. The progestogenic activity of 20β-HSD has also been characterized in women.

== See also ==
- 20α-Dihydroprogesterone
- 17α-Hydroxyprogesterone
- 16α-Hydroxyprogesterone
- 5α-Dihydroprogesterone
- 11-Deoxycorticosterone
