= Dihydroprogesterone =

Dihydroprogesterone may refer to:

- 5α-Dihydroprogesterone
- 5β-Dihydroprogesterone
- 20α-Dihydroprogesterone (20α-hydroxyprogesterone)
- 20β-Dihydroprogesterone (20β-hydroxyprogesterone)
- 3α-Dihydroprogesterone
- 3β-Dihydroprogesterone
- 17α,21-Dihydroprogesterone (11-deoxycortisol)
- 11β,21-Dihydroprogesterone (corticosterone)

== See also ==
- Progesterone
- Pregnanedione
- Pregnanolone
- Pregnanediol
- Pregnanetriol
- Hydroxyprogesterone
