= 16α-Hydroxyprogesterone =

Names
- IUPAC name 16α-Hydroxypregn-4-ene-3,20-dione
- Systematic IUPAC name (1R,2R,3aS,3bS,9aR,9bS,11aS)-1-Acetyl-2-hydroxy-9a,11a-dimethyl-1,2,3,3a,3b,4,5,8,9,9a,9b,10,11,11a-tetradecahydro-7H-cyclopenta[a]phenanthren-7-one
- Other names 16α-OHP; 16α-OH-PROG

Identifiers
CAS Number	438-07-3
3D model (JSmol)	Interactive image
ChEBI	CHEBI:15826
ChEMBL	ChEMBL1908005
ChemSpider	213144
PubChem CID	243761
UNII	Y7JT9A46EO
CompTox Dashboard (EPA)	DTXSID001017030
- InChI: InChI=1S/C21H30O3/c1-12(22)19-18(24)11-17-15-5-4-13-10-14(23)6-8-20(13,2)16(15)7-9-21(17,19)3/h10,15-19,24H,4-9,11H2,1-3H3/t15-,16+,17+,18-,19+,20+,21+/m1/s1 Key: LOVNYFVWYTXDRE-RMWFXKKMSA-N
- SMILES: CC(=O)[C@H]1[C@@H](C[C@@H]2[C@@]1(CC[C@H]3[C@H]2CCC4=CC(=O)CC[C@]34C)C)O

Properties
Chemical formula	C_{21}H_{30}O_{3}
Molar mass	330.468 g·mol^{−1}
- Except where otherwise noted, data are given for materials in their standard state (at 25 °C [77 °F], 100 kPa). Infobox references

16α-Hydroxyprogesterone (16α-OHP), also known as 16α-hydroxypregn-4-ene-3,20-dione, is a minor endogenous progestogen steroid hormone and a metabolite of progesterone that is formed in lower amounts than 17α-hydroxyprogesterone (17α-OHP). It occurs in micromolar concentrations and its physiological relevance hence is questionable. However, it may accumulate in target tissues and could have a physiological role in the reproductive system and mammary gland development as well as the cardiovascular and central nervous systems.

16α-OHP is formed from progesterone via 16α-hydroxylation primarily by CYP17A1 and primarily in steroidogenic tissues including the adrenal glands, testes, and ovaries. It is also synthesized from progesterone during pregnancy by hepatic cytochrome P450 enzymes like CYP3A4 and CYP1A1 in the fetal liver as well as placenta. It appears to be an end metabolite of progesterone and does not seem to be further metabolized.

16α-OHP has approximately 67% and 43% of the affinity of progesterone for the PR-A and PR-B, respectively, and acts as an agonist of these receptors similarly to progesterone. It was found to produce natriuresis similar to that produced by spironolactone when administered to humans, suggesting that it also has antimineralocorticoid activity similarly to progesterone. However, surprisingly, 16α-OHP showed low affinity for the mineralocorticoid receptor (MR) of greater than 1 μM (compared to 1 nM for progesterone) and showed no antagonism of the MR at up to a concentration of 1 μM (whereas progesterone shows potent such activity). However, the findings of another study suggested that 16α-OHP antagonizes the effects of aldosterone via the MR, and it may still be possible that 16α-OHP has significant antimineralocorticoid activity in some cells in spite of its weak MR affinity.

== See also ==
- 5α-Dihydroprogesterone
- 11-Deoxycorticosterone (21-hydroxyprogesterone)
- 20-Dihydroprogesterone
- Algestone (16α,17α-dihydroxyprogesterone)
