= 20α-Dihydroprogesterone =

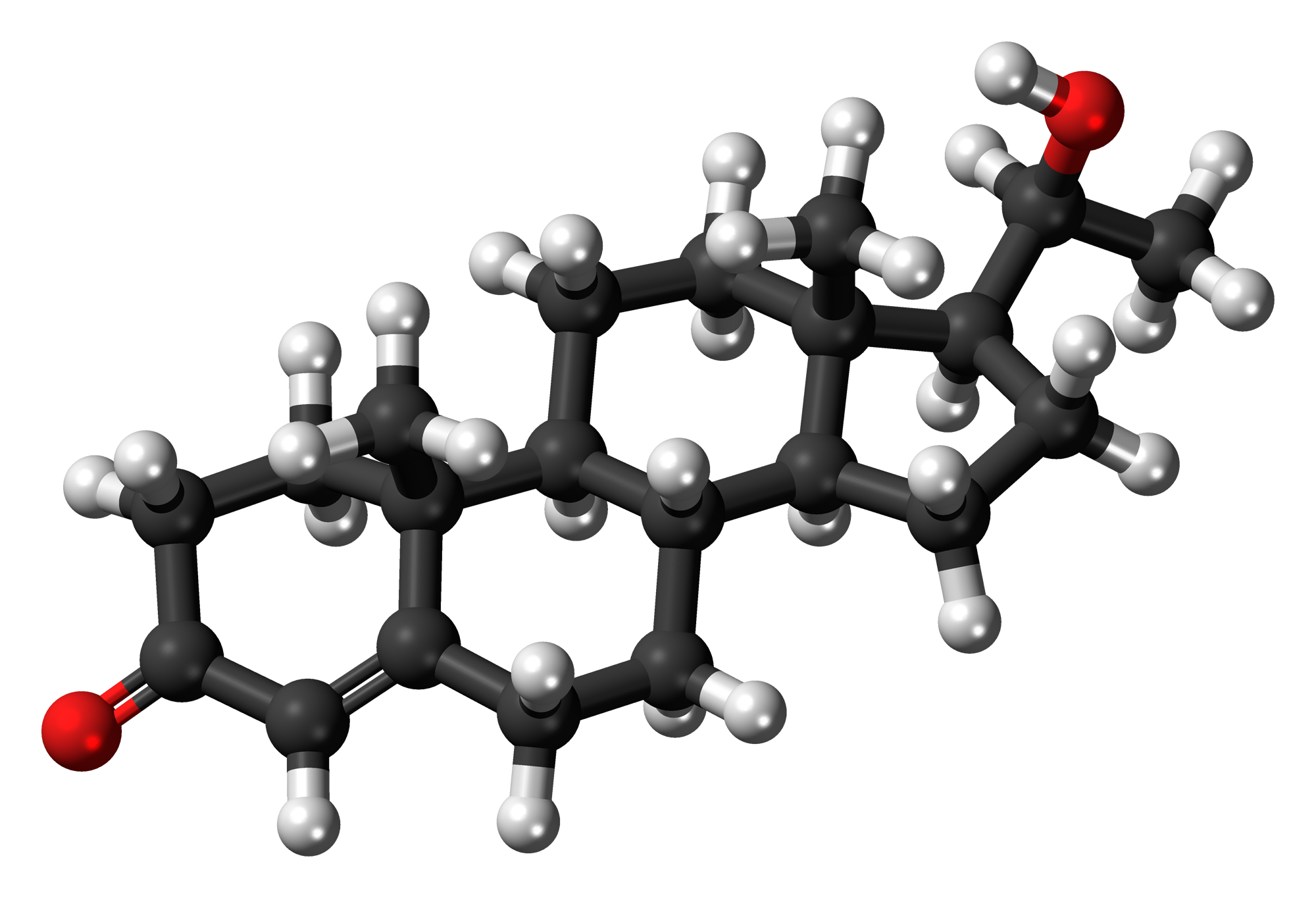

Names
- IUPAC name 20α-Hydroxypregn-4-en-3-one
- Systematic IUPAC name (1S,3aS,3bS,9aR,9bS,11aS)-1-[(1S)-1-Hydroxyethyl]-9a,11a-dimethyl-1,2,3,3a,3b,4,5,8,9,9a,9b,10,11,11a-tetradecahydro-7H-cyclopenta[a]phenanthren-7-one
- Other names 20α-DHP; 20α-Hydroxyprogesterone; 20α-OHP; Pregn-4-en-20α-ol-3-one

Identifiers
| CAS Number | 145-14-2 |
| 3D model (JSmol) | Interactive image |
| ChemSpider | 83725 |
| EC Number | 205-649-5 |
| MeSH | 20-alpha-Dihydroprogesterone |
| PubChem CID | 8956 |
| UNII | 45630A64AC |
| CompTox Dashboard (EPA) | DTXSID10904767 |
- InChI: InChI=1S/C21H32O2/c1-13(22)17-6-7-18-16-5-4-14-12-15(23)8-10-20(14,2)19(16)9-11-21(17,18)3/h12-13,16-19,22H,4-11H2,1-3H3/t13-,16-,17+,18-,19-,20-,21+/m0/s1 Key: RWBRUCCWZPSBFC-RXRZZTMXSA-N
- SMILES: C[C@@H]([C@H]1CC[C@@H]2[C@@]1(CC[C@H]3[C@H]2CCC4=CC(=O)CC[C@]34C)C)O

Properties
| Chemical formula | C_{21}H_{32}O_{2} |
| Molar mass | 316.478 g/mol |
- Except where otherwise noted, data are given for materials in their standard state (at 25 °C [77 °F], 100 kPa). verify (what is ?) Infobox references

20α-Dihydroprogesterone (20α-DHP), also known as 20α-hydroxyprogesterone (20α-OHP), is a naturally occurring, endogenous progestogen. It is a metabolite of progesterone, formed by the 20α-hydroxysteroid dehydrogenases (20α-HSDs) AKR1C1, AKR1C2, and AKR1C3 and the 17β-hydroxysteroid dehydrogenase (17β-HSD) HSD17B1. 20α-DHP can be transformed back into progesterone by 20α-HSDs and by the 17β-HSD HSD17B2. HSD17B2 is expressed in the human endometrium and cervix among other tissues. In animal studies, 20α-DHP has been found to be selectively taken up into and retained in target tissues such as the uterus, brain, and skeletal muscle.

20α-DHP has very low affinity for the progesterone receptor and is much less potent as a progestogen in comparison to progesterone, with about one-fifth of the relative progestogenic activity. It has also been found to act as an aromatase inhibitor and to inhibit the production of estrogen in breast tissue in vitro.

A single 200-mg oral dose of micronized progesterone has been found to result in peak levels of 20α-DHP of around 1 ng/mL after 2 hours. In another study however, peak levels of 20α-DHP were around 10 ng/mL during therapy with 300 mg/day oral micronized progesterone. 20α-DHP is formed from progesterone in the liver and in target tissues such as the endometrium. It appears to be more slowly eliminated than progesterone.

Levels of 5α-DHP have been quantified.

== See also ==
- 20β-Dihydroprogesterone
- 17α-Hydroxyprogesterone
- 16α-Hydroxyprogesterone
- 5α-Dihydroprogesterone
- 11-Deoxycorticosterone
