= 3alpha(or 20beta)-hydroxysteroid dehydrogenase =

Class of enzymes

3-alpha(or 20-beta)-hydroxysteroid dehydrogenase
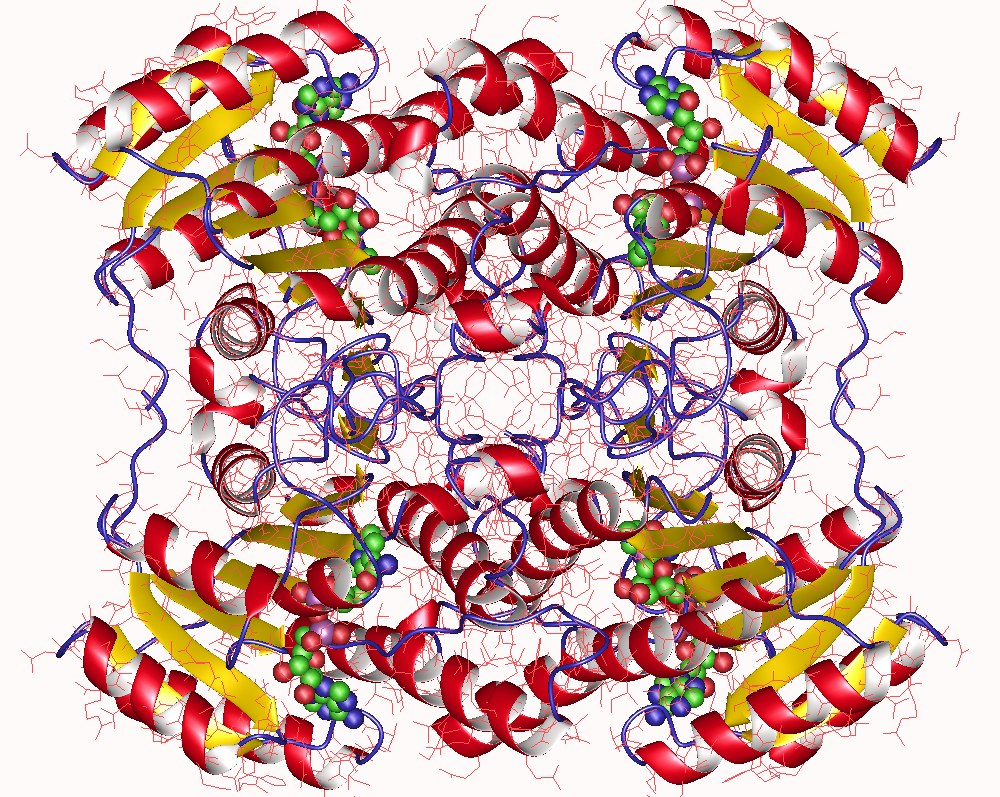
- 3-alpha,20-beta-hydroxysteroid dehydrogenase tetramer, Streptomyces exfoliatus

Identifiers
- EC no.: 1.1.1.53
- CAS no.: 9028-42-6

Databases
- IntEnz: IntEnz view
- BRENDA: BRENDA entry
- ExPASy: NiceZyme view
- KEGG: KEGG entry
- MetaCyc: metabolic pathway
- PRIAM: profile
- PDB structures: RCSB PDB PDBe PDBsum
- Gene Ontology: AmiGO / QuickGO
Search
- PMC: articles
- PubMed: articles
- NCBI: proteins

In enzymology, a 3alpha(or 20beta)-hydroxysteroid dehydrogenase (EC 1.1.1.53) is an enzyme that catalyzes the chemical reaction

3α-Androstanediol
+ NAD^{+}
H^{+}
H^{+}
Dihydrotestosterone
+ NADH

The two substrates of this enzyme are 3α-androstanediol and oxidised nicotinamide adenine dinucleotide (NAD^{+}). Its products are dihydrotestosterone, reduced NADH, and a proton.

This enzyme belongs to the family of oxidoreductases, specifically those acting on the CH-OH group of donor with NAD^{+} or NADP^{+} as acceptor. The systematic name of this enzyme class is 3alpha(or 20beta)-hydroxysteroid:NAD^{+} oxidoreductase. Other names in common use include cortisone reductase, (R)-20-hydroxysteroid dehydrogenase, dehydrogenase, 20beta-hydroxy steroid, Delta4-3-ketosteroid hydrogenase, 20beta-hydroxysteroid dehydrogenase, 3alpha,20beta-hydroxysteroid:NAD^{+}-oxidoreductase, NADH-20beta-hydroxysteroid dehydrogenase, and 20beta-HSD. This enzyme participates in bile acid biosynthesis and c21-steroid hormone metabolism.

== Structural studies ==
As of late 2007, 6 structures have been solved for this class of enzymes, with PDB accession codes 1HDC, 1N5D, 1NFF, 1NFQ, 1NFR, and 2HSD.
