= List of neurosteroids =

Allopregnanolone, a major endogenous inhibitory neurosteroid.

Steroid ring system.

Neurosteroids are natural and synthetic steroids that are active on the mammalian nervous system through receptors other than steroid hormone receptors. It includes inhibitory, excitatory, and neurotrophic neurosteroids as well as pheromones and vomeropherines. In contrast to steroid hormones, neurosteroids have rapid, non-genomic effects through interactions with membrane steroid receptors and can quickly influence central nervous system function.

== Inhibitory ==
=== Natural ===
==== Cholestanes ====
- 25-Hydroxycholesterol: cholest-5-en-3β,25-diol – NMDA receptor negative allosteric modulator

==== Androstanes ====
- 3α,5α-Androstanediol (3α-androstanediol): 5α-androstane-3α,17β-diol – GABA_{A} receptor positive allosteric modulator
- 3α,5β-Androstanediol (etiocholanediol): 5β-androstane-3α,17β-diol – GABA_{A} receptor positive allosteric modulator
- 3α-Androstenol: 5α-androst-16-en-3α-ol – GABA_{A} receptor positive allosteric modulator
- Androsterone: 5α-androstan-3α-ol-17-one – GABA_{A} receptor positive allosteric modulator
- Etiocholanolone: 5β-androstan-3α-ol-17-one – GABA_{A} receptor positive allosteric modulator

The following are proneurosteroids:

- Dihydrotestosterone (DHT; androstanolone, stanolone): 5α-androst-17β-ol-3-one – of the above-listed inhibitory androstane neurosteroids
- Testosterone: androst-4-en-17β-ol-3-one – of the above-listed inhibitory androstane neurosteroids

==== Pregnanes ====
- 3α-Dihydroprogesterone (3α-DHP): pregn-4-en-3α-ol-20-one – GABA_{A} receptor positive allosteric modulator
- 5α-Dihydroprogesterone (5α-DHP; allopregnanedione): 5α-pregnane-3,20-dione – GABA_{A} receptor positive allosteric modulator
- 5β-Dihydroprogesterone (5β-DHP; pregnanedione): 5β-pregnane-3,20-dione – GABA_{A} receptor positive allosteric modulator
- Allopregnanediol: 5α-pregnane-3α,20α-diol – GABA_{A} receptor positive allosteric modulator
- Allopregnanolone (brexanolone; SAGE-547): 5α-pregnan-3α-ol-20-one – GABA_{A} receptor positive allosteric modulator
- Dihydrodeoxycorticosterone (DHDOC): 21-hydroxy-5α-pregnan-20-one – GABA_{A} receptor positive allosteric modulator
- Pregnanediol: 5β-pregnan-3α,20α-diol – GABA_{A} receptor positive allosteric modulator
- Pregnanolone (eltanolone): 5β-pregnan-3α-ol-20-one – GABA_{A} receptor positive allosteric modulator
- Tetrahydrodeoxycorticosterone (THDOC): 3α,21-dihydroxy-5α-pregnan-20-one – GABA_{A} receptor positive allosteric modulator

The following are proneurosteroids:

- Deoxycorticosterone (desoxycortone): 21-hydroxypregn-4-ene-3,20-dione – of DHDOC and THDOC
- Pregnenolone (P5): pregn-5-en-3β-ol-20-one – of pregnanolones and pregnanediols (see above)
- Progesterone (P4): pregn-4-ene-3,20-dione – of pregnanediones, pregnanolones, and pregnanediols (see above)

=== Synthetic ===
==== Cholestanes ====
- Acebrochol (cholesteryl acetate dibromide): 5α,6β-dibromocholestan-3β-ol 3β-acetate – GABA_{A} receptor positive allosteric modulator

==== Pregnanes ====
- Alfadolone: 3α,21-dihydroxy-5α-pregnane-11,20-dione – GABA_{A} receptor positive allosteric modulator
- Alfadolone acetate: 3α,21-dihydroxy-5α-pregnane-11,20-dione 21-acetate – GABA_{A} receptor positive allosteric modulator
- Alfaxalone: 3α-hydroxy-5α-pregnane-11,20-dione – GABA_{A} receptor positive allosteric modulator
- EIDD-036 (P4-20-O): 20-(hydroxyimino)pregn-4-en-3-one – progesterone-like inhibitory neurosteroid
- Ganaxolone: 3β-methyl-5α-pregnan-3α-ol-20-one – GABA_{A} receptor positive allosteric modulator
- Hydroxydione: 21-hydroxy-5β-pregnane-3,20-dione – GABA_{A} receptor positive allosteric modulator
- Minaxolone: 11α-(dimethylamino)-2β-ethoxy-5α-pregnan-3α-ol-20-one – GABA_{A} receptor positive allosteric modulator
- ORG-20599: 21-chloro-2β-morpholin-4-yl-5β-pregnan-3α-ol-20-one – GABA_{A} receptor positive allosteric modulator
- ORG-21465: 2β-(2,2-dimethyl-4-morpholinyl)-3α-hydroxy-11,20-dioxo-5α-pregnan-21-yl methanesulfonate – GABA_{A} receptor positive allosteric modulator
- Posovolone (Co 134444): 3β-Hydroxy-21-(1H-imidazol-1-yl)-3α-(methoxymethyl)-5α-pregnan-20-one – GABA_{A} receptor positive allosteric modulator
- Renanolone: 5β-pregnan-3α-ol-11,20-dione – GABA_{A} receptor positive allosteric modulator
- SGE-516 – GABA_{A} receptor positive allosteric modulator
- SGE-872 – GABA_{A} receptor positive allosteric modulator
- Zuranolone (SAGE-217): 3α-hydroxy-3β-methyl-21-(4-cyano-1H-pyrazol-1'-yl)-19-nor-5β-pregnan-20-one – GABA_{A} receptor positive allosteric modulator

The following are proneurosteroids:

- EIDD-1723 – of EIDD-036 (see above)
- P1-185 – of progesterone and by extension pregnanediones, pregnanolones, and pregnanediols (see above)
- Progesterone carboxymethyloxime (P4-3-CMO) – of progesterone and by extension pregnanediones, pregnanolones, and pregnanediols (see above)

==== Androstanes ====
- Sipasterol (YC-9; androtriol; annaosanchun): 5α-androstane-3β,5α,6β-triol – undefined mechanism of action

== Excitatory ==
=== Natural ===
==== Cholestanes ====
- Cerebrosterol (24(S)-Hydroxycholesterol): cholest-5-en-3β,24S-diol – NMDA receptor positive allosteric modulator

==== Pregnanes ====
- 3β-Dihydroprogesterone (3β-DHP): pregn-4-en-3β-ol-20-one – GABA_{A} receptor negative allosteric modulator
- Epipregnanolone: 5β-pregnan-3β-ol-20-one – GABA_{A} receptor negative allosteric modulator
- Isopregnanolone (sepranolone): 5α-pregnan-3β-ol-20-one – GABA_{A} receptor negative allosteric modulator
- Pregnenolone sulfate (PS): pregn-5-en-3β-ol-20-one 3β-sulfate – GABA_{A} receptor negative allosteric modulator, NMDA receptor positive allosteric modulator, sigma-1 receptor agonist, TRPM3 agonist, other actions

The following are proneurosteroids:

- Pregnenolone (P5): pregn-5-en-3β-ol-20-one – of pregnenolone sulfate

==== Androstanes ====
- Dehydroepiandrosterone (DHEA; prasterone): androst-5-en-3β-ol-17-one – GABA_{A} receptor positive allosteric modulator, NMDA receptor positive allosteric modulator, sigma-1 receptor agonist, other actions
- Dehydroepiandrosterone sulfate (DHEA-S; prasterone sulfate): androst-5-en-3β-ol-17-one 3β-sulfate – GABA_{A} receptor negative allosteric modulator, NMDA receptor positive allosteric modulator, other actions

=== Synthetic ===
==== Androstanes ====
- 17-Phenylandrostenol (17-PA): 17-phenyl-5α-androst-16-en-3α-ol – GABA_{A} receptor negative allosteric modulator
- Golexanolone (GR-3027): 3α-ethynyl-3β-hydroxyandrostan-17E-one oxime – GABA_{A} receptor negative allosteric modulator

==== Others ====
- SAGE-201 - oxysterol/cholesterol analogue – NMDA receptor positive allosteric modulator
- SAGE-301 - oxysterol/cholesterol analogue – NMDA receptor positive allosteric modulator
- SAGE-718: oxysterol/cholesterol analogue; exact chemical structure undisclosed – NMDA receptor positive allosteric modulator

== Mixed ==
=== Natural ===
==== Cholestanes ====
- Cholesterol: cholest-5-en-3β-ol – NMDA receptor positive allosteric modulator, possible GABA_{A} receptor positive allosteric modulator, many other actions

==== Pregnanes ====
- Epipregnanolone sulfate: 5β-pregnan-3β-ol-20-one 3β-sulfate – GABA_{A} and NMDA receptor negative allosteric modulator, TRPM3 agonist

== Neurotrophic ==
=== Natural ===
==== Androstanes ====
- Dehydroepiandrosterone (DHEA; prasterone): androst-5-en-3β-ol-17-one – TrkA, TrkC, and p75^{NTR} agonist, TrkB ligand
- Dehydroepiandrosterone sulfate (DHEA-S; prasterone sulfate): androst-5-en-3β-ol-17-one 3β-sulfate – TrkA and p75^{NTR} agonist

==== Ergostanes ====
- Anicequol (NGA0187, NGD-187): 16β-acetoxy-3β,7β,11β-trihydroxy-5α-ergost-22(E)-en-6-one – non-endogenous; fungi-derived; undefined mechanism of action; shows neurotrophic activity in vitro; was formerly under development for the treatment of cognitive disorders

=== Synthetic ===
==== Androstanes ====
- BNN-20: 17β-spiro-(androst-5-en-17,2'-oxiran)-3β-ol – TrkA, TrkB, and p75^{NTR} agonist

==== Pregnanes ====
- BNN-27: 17α,20R-epoxypregn-5-ene-3β,21-diol – TrkA and p75^{NTR} agonist

== Antineurotrophic ==
=== Natural ===
==== Androstanes ====
- Testosterone: androst-4-en-17β-ol-3-one – TrkA and p75^{NTR} antagonist

=== Synthetic ===
==== Pregnanes ====
- Dexamethasone: 9α-fluoro-11β,17α,21-trihydroxy-16α-methylpregna-1,4-diene-3,20-dione – TrkA and p75^{NTR} antagonist

== Pheromones and pherines ==
=== Natural ===
==== Androstanes ====
- 3α-Androstenol: 5α-androst-16-en-3α-ol
- 3β-Androstenol: 5α-androst-16-en-3β-ol
- Androstadienol: androsta-5,16-dien-3β-ol
- Androstadienone: androsta-4,16-dien-3-one
- Androstenone: 5α-androst-16-en-3-one
- Androsterone: 5α-androstan-3α-ol-17-one

==== Estranes ====
- Estratetraenol: estra-1,3,5(10),16-tetraen-3-ol

=== Synthetic ===
==== Androstanes ====
- Fasedienol (Aloradine; PH94B; 4-androstadienol): androsta-4,16-dien-3β-ol

==== Estranes ====
- Estratetraenyl acetate (ETA): estra-1,3,5(10),16-tetraen-3-yl acetate

==== Pregnanes ====
- Pregnadienedione (PDD): pregna-4,20-dien-3,6-dione

==== Others ====
- PH10, PH15, PH30, PH56, PH78, PH84, Salubrin (PH80) – pherines with undefined structures developed by a company called Pherin Pharmaceuticals

== Others ==
=== Natural ===
==== Pregnanes ====
- Pregnenolone (P5): pregn-5-en-3β-ol-20-one – MAP2 ligand
- Progesterone (P4): pregn-4-ene-3,20-dione – sigma-1 receptor antagonist, nicotinic acetylcholine receptor negative allosteric modulator, MAP2 ligand, other actions

==== Spirostanes ====
- Caprospinol (SP-233; diosgenin 3-caproate): (22R,25R)-20α-spirost-5-en-3β-yl hexanoate – β-amyloid ligand, sigma-1 receptor ligand, other actions; found naturally in Gynura japonica; under development as a neuroprotective against Alzheimer's disease

==== Estranes ====
- Estradiol (E2): Estra-1,3,5(10)-triene-3,17β-diol; found to increase the expression of the oxytocin receptor.

=== Synthetic ===
==== Pregnanes ====
- 3β-Methoxypregnenolone (MAP-4343): 3β-methoxypregn-5-en-20-one – MAP2 ligand
- Cyclopregnol (neurosterone): 6β-hydroxy-3:5-cyclopregnan-20-one – undefined mechanism of action; developed as a "psychotropic agent" for the treatment of "mental disorders" such as schizophrenia in the 1950s

==== Androstanes ====
- Cetadiol: androst-5-ene-3β,16α-diol – undefined mechanism of action; developed as a "tranquilizer" and for the treatment of alcoholism in the 1950s

== See also ==
- List of steroids
- Neurosteroidogenesis inhibitor
