= Pregnanediol (disambiguation) =

Pregnanediol may refer to:

- Allopregnanediols:
  - 5α-Pregnane-3β,20α-diol
  - 5α-Pregnane-3α,20β-diol
  - 5α-Pregnane-3β,20β-diol
  - Allopregnanediol (5α-pregnane-3α,20α-diol)
- Pregnanediols:
  - 5β-Pregnane-3β,20α-diol
  - 5β-Pregnane-3α,20β-diol
  - 5β-Pregnane-3β,20β-diol
  - Pregnanediol (5β-pregnane-3α,20α-diol)

== See also ==
- Progesterone
- Pregnanedione
- Pregnanolone
- Pregnanetriol
- Dihydroprogesterone
- Hydroxyprogesterone
