= C26H40N2O3 =

The molecular formula C_{26}H_{40}N_{2}O_{3} (molar mass : 428.617 g/mol) may refer to:

- P1-185
- Posovolone
