= List of clinical studies of menopausal hormone therapy =

The following is a list of notable clinical studies of menopausal hormone therapy (estrogen and/or progestogen therapy) in women, including randomized controlled trials and observational studies.

== Randomized controlled trials ==
- Clinical Study on Hormone Dose Optimisation in Climacteric Symptoms Evaluation (CHOICE)
- Comparative Effect on Bone Density, Endometrium, and Lipids of Continuous Hormones as Replacement Therapy (CHART)
- Danish Osteoporosis Prevention Study (DOPS) (open-label)
- Early versus Late Intervention Trial with Estradiol (ELITE)
- Estrogen in Prevention of Atherosclerosis Trial (EPAT)
- Estrogen Replacement and Atherosclerosis (ERA)
- Estrogen in Venous Thromboembolism Trial (EVTET)
- Heart and Estrogen/Progestin Replacement Study (HERS)
- Hormone replacement therapy After Breast cancer — Is iT Safe? (HABITS)
- Kronos Early Estrogen Prevention Study (KEEPS)
- Papworth HRT Atherosclerosis Study (PHASE)
- Perimenopausal Estrogen Replacement Therapy Study (PERT)
- Postmenopausal Estrogen/Progestin Interventions (PEPI)
- Stockholm Trial or Stockholm Randomized Trial
- Women's Estrogen for Stroke Trial (WEST)
- Women's Estrogen Lipid-Lowering Hormone Atherosclerosis Regression Trial (WELL-HART)
- Women's Health Initiative Estrogen Study (WHI-E)
- Women's Health Initiative Estrogen + Progestin Study (WHI-EP)
- Women's Health, Osteoporosis, Progestin, Estrogen (Women's HOPE)
- Women's International Study of Long-Duration Oestrogen After Menopause (WISDOM)

== Observational studies ==
- CECILE (French study)
- Combined Cohorts of Menopausal Women, studies of Register Based Health Outcomes in Relation to Hormonal Drugs (COMPREHEND)
- Estrogen and Thromboembolism Risk (ESTHER)
- European Prospective Investigation into Cancer and Nutrition (EPIC)
  - French cohort: Etude Epidémiologique auprès de femmes de l'Education National (E3N, E3N-EPIC)
- Framingham Heart Study (FHS)
- Menopause, Estrogen and Venous Events (MEVE)
- Menopause: Risk of Breast Cancer, Morbidity and Prevalence (MISSION)
- Million Women Study (MWS)
- Nurses' Health Study (NHS)
- Study of NorpregnAnes on Coagulation (SNAC)
- Women's Health Initiative Observational Study (WHI-OS)

== See also ==
- List of clinical studies of hormonal birth control
