= C21H28O2 =

The molecular formula C_{21}H_{28}O_{2} (molar mass: 312.44 g/mol) may refer to:

- 11-Dehydroprogesterone
- Demegestone
- Dydrogesterone
- Ethisterone, a progesterone hormone
- Guggulsterone
- Levonorgestrel
- Norgestrel, a progestin (Dextronorgestrel)
- Pregna-4,20-dien-3,6-dione
- Tetrahydrogestrinone, an anabolic steroid
- Tibolone, a steroid hormone
- Δ4-Tibolone, a metabolite of tibolone
- Trimethyltrienolone
- 7,8-Dihydrocannabinol
