= C21H36O2 =

The molecular formula C_{21}H_{36}O_{2} may refer to:

- Allopregnanediol, or 5α-pregnane-3α,20α-diol, a steroid
- Adipostatin A, an alkylresorcinol
- Pregnanediol, a steroid
