= 17P =

17P or 17.P or 17-P may refer to:

- 17P/Holmes, a comet
- SpaceShipOne flight 17P, a commercial spaceflight
- 17α-Hydroxyprogesterone, a steroid hormone and intermediate
- 17p, the short arm of the 17th human chromosome that has the p53 tumour suppressor gene
- 17-Phenylandrostenol
- 17-pounder

== See also ==
- P17 (disambiguation)
