= Refisolone =

Clinical data
- Other names: PH-80; PH80; PH-80-M; PH80-M; PH80M; PH80-PMD NS; PH80-HF; PH80-HF NS; Salubrin; Salubrin HF; ORG-39479; ORG39479; 10-Hydroxy-16α,17α-epoxyestr-4-en-3-one; 16α,17α-Epoxyestr-4-en-10-ol-3-one
- Routes of administration: Intranasal (nasal spray)
- Drug class: Vomeropherine

Identifiers
- IUPAC name: (1S,2S,4R,6S,7S,10S,11S)-11-hydroxy-7-methyl-5-oxapentacyclo[8.8.0.0^{2,7}.0^{4,6}.0^{11,16}]octadec-15-en-14-one
- CAS Number: 202718-04-5
- PubChem CID: 21968346
- UNII: 2QA794326X

Chemical and physical data
- Formula: C_{18}H_{24}O_{3}
- Molar mass: 288.387 g·mol^{−1}
- 3D model (JSmol): Interactive image
- SMILES: C[C@]12CC[C@H]3[C@H]([C@@H]1C[C@@H]4[C@H]2O4)CCC5=CC(=O)CC[C@]35O
- InChI: InChI=1S/C18H24O3/c1-17-6-5-13-12(14(17)9-15-16(17)21-15)3-2-10-8-11(19)4-7-18(10,13)20/h8,12-16,20H,2-7,9H2,1H3/t12-,13+,14+,15-,16-,17+,18-/m1/s1; Key:WLYKLZRFENOYIA-QQNKPZKVSA-N

Refisolone (INN, USAN; developmental code names PH-80, Salubrin, and ORG-39479), also known as 10-hydroxy-16α,17α-epoxyestr-4-en-3-one, is a vomeropherine (pherine) which is under development for the treatment of hot flashes, migraine, and premenstrual dysphoric disorder (PMDD). It is taken intranasally as a nasal spray. The pharmacology of refisolone has been studied and reported. The drug is under development by Pherin Pharmaceuticals and VistaGen Therapeutics, with the former having been acquired by the latter in 2023. As of December 2025, refisolone is in phase 2 clinical trials for all indications. However, a phase 3 trial of refisolone for PMDD is also reported to have been registered in 2015, though its status is listed as unknown.

== See also ==
- List of neurosteroids § Pheromones and pherines
- List of investigational sex-hormonal agents
- List of investigational PMS/PMDD drugs
- List of investigational headache and migraine drugs
- Fasedienol (PH94B; Aloradine)
- Itruvone (PH10)
