= Cetadiol =

Chemical compound

Clinical data
- Other names: Androst-5-ene-3β,16α-diol; 3β,16α-Dihydroxy-5-androstene
- Routes of administration: Oral

Identifiers
- IUPAC name: (3S,8S,9S,10R,13R,14S,16R)-10,13-Dimethyl-2,3,4,7,8,9,11,12,14,15,16,17-dodecahydro-1H-cyclopenta[a]phenanthrene-3,16-diol
- CAS Number: 3642-89-5
- PubChem CID: 19274
- ChemSpider: 18185
- UNII: 5XQV9LZ9J8
- KEGG: C14631
- ChEBI: CHEBI:34452
- CompTox Dashboard (EPA): DTXSID40957766

Chemical and physical data
- Formula: C_{19}H_{30}O_{2}
- Molar mass: 290.447 g·mol^{−1}
- 3D model (JSmol): Interactive image
- SMILES: C[C@]12CC[C@H]3[C@H]([C@@H]1C[C@H](C2)O)CC=C4[C@@]3(CC[C@@H](C4)O)C
- InChI: InChI=1S/C19H30O2/c1-18-7-6-16-15(17(18)10-14(21)11-18)4-3-12-9-13(20)5-8-19(12,16)2/h3,13-17,20-21H,4-11H2,1-2H3/t13-,14+,15+,16-,17-,18+,19-/m0/s1; Key:CVCDJRPXEWJAAY-UVSUZTNJSA-N

Cetadiol, also known as androst-5-ene-3β,16α-diol, is a drug described as a "steroid tranquilizer" which was briefly investigated as a treatment for alcoholism in the 1950s. It is an androstane steroid and analogue of 5-androstenediol (androst-5-ene-3β,17β-diol) and 16α-hydroxy-DHEA (androst-5-ene-3β,16α-diol-17-one), but showed no androgenic or myotrophic activity in animal bioassays. The drug was reported in 1956 and studied until 1958.

== See also ==
- Androstadienol (androsta-5,16-dien-3β-ol)
- Androstenol (5α-androst-16-en-3α-ol)
- 4-Androstadienol (PH94B; Aloradine)
- Cyclopregnol
