= P17 =

P17 may refer to:

- p17 protein, a protein of the HIV virus
- Papyrus 17, a biblical manuscript

== See also ==
- 17P (disambiguation)
