= Pregnanolone (disambiguation) =

Pregnanolone, also known as tetrahydroprogesterone (THP), may refer to:

- Allopregnanolone (3α-hydroxy-5α-pregnan-20-one or 3α,5α-tetrahydroprogesterone)
- Pregnanolone (3α-hydroxy-5β-pregnan-20-one or 3α,5β-tetrahydroprogesterone)
- Isopregnanolone (3β-hydoxy-5α-pregnan-20-one or 3β,5α-tetrahydroprogesterone)
- Epipregnanolone (3β-hydoxy-5β-pregnan-20-one or 3β,5β-tetrahydroprogesterone)

== See also ==
- Pregnenolone (disambiguation)
- Progesterone
- Pregnanedione
- Pregnanediol
- Pregnanetriol
- Dihydroprogesterone
- Hydroxyprogesterone
