= EIDD-1723 =

Chemical compound

Clinical data
- Other names: Progesterone 20E-[O-[(phosphonooxy)methyl]oxime] sodium salt; Pregn-4-ene-3,20-dione 20E-[O-[(phosphonooxy)methyl]oxime] sodium salt
- Drug class: Neurosteroid

Identifiers
- IUPAC name: Pregn-4-ene-3,20-dione 20E-[O-[(phosphonooxy)methyl]oxime] sodium salt
- CAS Number: 1659302-89-2
- PubChem CID: 165360134
- ChemSpider: 88297555
- UNII: CYX279XF56
- ChEMBL: ChEMBL5439511
- CompTox Dashboard (EPA): DTXSID801336311

Chemical and physical data
- Formula: C_{22}H_{32}NNa_{2}O_{6}P
- Molar mass: 483.452 g·mol^{−1}
- 3D model (JSmol): Interactive image
- SMILES: C/C([C@H]1CC[C@@]2([H])[C@]3([H])CCC4=CC(CC[C@]4(C)[C@@]3([H])CC[C@]12C)=O)=N\OCOP([O-])([O-])=O.[Na+].[Na+]
- InChI: InChI=1S/C22H34NO6P.2Na/c1-14(23-28-13-29-30(25,26)27)18-6-7-19-17-5-4-15-12-16(24)8-10-21(15,2)20(17)9-11-22(18,19)3;;/h12,17-20H,4-11,13H2,1-3H3,(H2,25,26,27);;/q;2*+1/p-2/b23-14+;;/t17-,18+,19-,20-,21-,22+;;/m0../s1; Key:SXDGHAWSHQZKQM-ZZSMYOISSA-L

EIDD-1723, also known as EPRX-01723 or as progesterone 20E-[O-[(phosphonooxy)methyl]oxime] sodium salt, is a synthetic, water-soluble analogue of progesterone and a neurosteroid which was developed for the potential treatment of traumatic brain injury. It is a rapidly converted prodrug of EIDD-036 (EPRX-036; progesterone 20-oxime), which is considered to be the active form of the agent. Previous C3 and C20 oxime derivatives of progesterone, such as P1-185 (progesterone 3-O-(L-valine)-E-oxime), were also developed and studied prior to EIDD-1723.

== See also ==
- List of neurosteroids § Inhibitory > Synthetic > Pregnanes
- List of progestogen esters § Oximes of progesterone derivatives
