= 3β-Methoxypregnenolone =

Chemical compound

Clinical data
- Other names: Pregnenolone 3-methyl ether; 3β-Methoxypregn-5-en-20-one

Identifiers
- IUPAC name: 1-[(3S,8S,9S,10R,13S,14S,17S)-3-Methoxy-10,13-dimethyl-2,3,4,7,8,9,11,12,14,15,16,17-dodecahydro-1H-cyclopenta[a]phenanthren-17-yl]ethanone
- CAS Number: 511-26-2
- PubChem CID: 233254
- ChemSpider: 203358
- UNII: TU767RK7YN
- CompTox Dashboard (EPA): DTXSID901304765

Chemical and physical data
- Formula: C_{22}H_{34}O_{2}
- Molar mass: 330.512 g·mol^{−1}
- 3D model (JSmol): Interactive image
- SMILES: CC(=O)[C@H]1CC[C@@H]2[C@@]1(CC[C@H]3[C@H]2CC=C4[C@@]3(CC[C@@H](C4)OC)C)C
- InChI: InChI=1S/C22H34O2/c1-14(23)18-7-8-19-17-6-5-15-13-16(24-4)9-11-21(15,2)20(17)10-12-22(18,19)3/h5,16-20H,6-13H2,1-4H3/t16-,17-,18+,19-,20-,21-,22+/m0/s1; Key:ZVGQOQHAMHMMNE-BIBIXIOVSA-N

3β-Methoxypregnenolone (developmental code name MAP-4343), or pregnenolone 3β-methyl ether, also known as 3β-methoxypregn-5-en-20-one, is a synthetic neuroactive steroid and derivative of pregnenolone. It interacts with microtubule-associated protein 2 (MAP2) in a similar manner to pregnenolone and is under development for potential clinical use for indications such as the treatment of brain and spinal cord injury and depressive disorders.

== See also ==
- List of investigational antidepressants
- List of neurosteroids
