= P1-185 =

Chemical compound

Clinical data
- Other names: (3E)-3-({[(2S)-2-Amino-3-methylbutanoyl]oxy}imino)pregn-4-en-20-one
- Drug class: Progestogen; Neurosteroid

Identifiers
- IUPAC name: [(E)-[(8S,9S,10R,13S,14S,17S)-17-acetyl-10,13-dimethyl-1,2,6,7,8,9,11,12,14,15,16,17-dodecahydrocyclopenta[a]phenanthren-3-ylidene]amino] (2S)-2-amino-3-methylbutanoate
- CAS Number: 1185297-01-1
- PubChem CID: 44219330
- ChemSpider: 25052147
- ChEMBL: ChEMBL565873
- CompTox Dashboard (EPA): DTXSID801148453

Chemical and physical data
- Formula: C_{26}H_{40}N_{2}O_{3}
- Molar mass: 428.617 g·mol^{−1}
- 3D model (JSmol): Interactive image
- SMILES: CC(C)[C@@H](C(=O)O/N=C/1\CC[C@@]2([C@H]3CC[C@]4([C@H]([C@@H]3CCC2=C1)CC[C@@H]4C(=O)C)C)C)N
- InChI: InChI=1S/C26H40N2O3/c1-15(2)23(27)24(30)31-28-18-10-12-25(4)17(14-18)6-7-19-21-9-8-20(16(3)29)26(21,5)13-11-22(19)25/h14-15,19-23H,6-13,27H2,1-5H3/b28-18+/t19-,20+,21-,22-,23-,25-,26+/m0/s; Key:JFIPYWOCXPCAFX-NPRMJFGVSA-N

P1-185, also known as progesterone 3-O-(L-valine)-E-oxime or as pregn-4-ene-3,20-dione 3-O-(L-valine)-E-oxime, is a synthetic progestogen and neurosteroid and an oxime ester analogue and prodrug of progesterone (and by extension of allopregnanolone). It was developed as an improved water-soluble version of progesterone such that it could be formulated as an aqueous preparation and easily and rapidly administered intravenously as a potential therapy for traumatic brain injury. However, the chemical synthesis of P1-185 was described as somewhat challenging, so oxime conjugates of progesterone of the C20 instead of C3 position, such as EIDD-1723 and EIDD-036, have since been developed.

== See also ==
- List of neurosteroids § Inhibitory > Synthetic > Pregnanes
- List of progestogen esters § Oximes of progesterone derivatives
