= Menopause, Estrogen and Venous Events =

The Menopause, Estrogen and Venous Events (MEVE) study was a retrospective observational study of menopausal hormone therapy and venous thromboembolism (VTE) in postmenopausal women with a previous history of VTE. It found that transdermal estradiol was not associated with increased risk of VTE (HR = 1.0, 95% CI 0.4–2.4) whereas oral estrogens were associated with a large increase in risk (HR = 6.4, 95% CI 1.5–27.3). The mean dose of transdermal estradiol in the study was 50 μg/day, although data on dose were missing for around 50% of women. Similarly, a small study found that transdermal estradiol did not influence coagulation in women with prior VTE. These findings are similar to studies in menopausal women without prior history of VTE which have found that transdermal estradiol has minimal influence on coagulation and is not associated with increased risk of VTE at doses of up to 100 μg/day. Menopausal hormone therapy guidelines have cited the MEVE study and recommended use of transdermal estradiol over oral estrogens in women at high risk for VTE. However, randomized controlled trials (RCTs) are still needed to definitively confirm findings that transdermal estradiol is safer than oral estrogens in terms of VTE risk.

== See also ==
- Estrogen in Venous Thromboembolism Trial (EVTET)
- List of notable clinical studies of menopausal hormone therapy
