= Pregnanetriolone =

Names
- IUPAC name 3R,5R,8S,9S,10S,13S,14S,17R)-3,17-dihydroxy-17-[(1S)-1-hydroxyethyl]-10,13-dimethyl-2,3,4,5,6,7,8,9,12,14,15,16-dodecahydro-1H-cyclopenta[a]phenanthren-11-one
- Other names 5β-Pregnane-3α,17α,20α-triol, 11-Ketopregnanetriol, 5beta-Pregnane-3alpha,17alpha,20alpha-triol-11-one

Identifiers
CAS Number	603-99-6
3D model (JSmol)	Interactive image
ChEBI	CHEBI:79870
ChemSpider	223202
KEGG	C15368
PubChem CID	254631
UNII	9K506VY344
CompTox Dashboard (EPA)	DTXSID001316846
- InChI: InChI=1S/C21H34O4/c1-12(22)21(25)9-7-16-15-5-4-13-10-14(23)6-8-19(13,2)18(15)17(24)11-20(16,21)3/h12-16,18,22-23,25H,4-11H2,1-3H3/t12-,13+,14+,15-,16-,18+,19-,20-,21-/m0/s1 Key: WKFXHNDWEHDGQD-ZQRGSSBZSA-N
- SMILES: CC(C1(CCC2C1(CC(=O)C3C2CCC4C3(CCC(C4)O)C)C)O)O

Properties
Chemical formula	C_{21}H_{34}O_{4}
Molar mass	350.499 g·mol^{−1}
- Except where otherwise noted, data are given for materials in their standard state (at 25 °C [77 °F], 100 kPa). Infobox references

Pregnanetriolone, or 11-ketopregnanetriol, is a steroid hormone.

== Clinical significance ==
There is no or little urinare excretion of pregnanetriolone in the urine in healthy people.

Pregnanetriolone is a metabolite of 21-deoxycortisol.

In patients with congenital adrenal hyperplasia due to 21-hydroxylase deficiency (CAH), the daily excretion exceeds 100 μg. ACTH stimulation increased excrement even further. It has been concluded since at least 1974 that the excretion of pregnenolone in urine after ACTH stimulation test can help detect heterozygous carriers of congenital adrenal hyperplasia caused by 21-hydroxylase deficiency (non-classical forms of CAH). These conclusions were confirmed by later studies.

Pregnanetriolone can be used as a marker screening and for monitoring of treatment in infants with classical forms of CAH.

== See also ==
- Pregnanetriol
