= Pregnanedione =

Pregnanedione, or pregnane-3,20-dione, may refer to:

- 5α-Dihydroprogesterone (5α-pregnane-3,20-dione)
- 5β-Dihydroprogesterone (5β-pregnane-3,20-dione)

== See also ==
- Progesterone (pregn-4-ene-3,20-dione)
- Pregnanolone
- Pregnanediol
- Pregnanetriol
- Pregna-4,20-dien-3,6-dione
- Hydroxyprogesterone
