= Pregnenolone (disambiguation) =

Pregnenolone may refer to:

- Pregnenolone (pregn-5-en-3β-ol-20-one)
  - Pregnenolone (medication)
  - Pregnenolone sulfate
- 3β-Dihydroprogesterone (pregn-4-en-3β-ol-20-one)
- 3α-Dihydroprogesterone (pregn-4-en-3α-ol-20-one)

== See also ==
- Pregnanolone (disambiguation)
- Pregneninolone or ethisterone
- Progesterone
