= List of clinical studies of hormonal birth control =

The following is a list of notable clinical studies of hormonal birth control in premenopausal women:

- Royal College of General Practitioners Oral Contraception Study
- Oxford/Family Planning Association Contraceptive Study (Oxford–FPA Study)
- Kaiser Permanente Walnut Creek Contraceptive Drug Study (CDS)
- World Health Organization Special Programme on Human Reproduction (HRP)
- Oral Contraceptive and Hemostasis Study Group
- International Active Surveillance Study – Safety of Contraceptives: Role of Estrogens (INAS-SCORE)
- Prospective Controlled Cohort Study on the Safety of a Monophasic Oral Contraceptive Containing Nomegestrol Acetate (2.5mg) and 17β-Estradiol (1.5mg) (PRO-E2)

== See also ==
- List of clinical studies of menopausal hormone therapy
