= BNN-27 =

Chemical compound

Clinical data
- Other names: BNN27; (20R)-3β,21-Dihydroxy-17α,20-epoxypregn-5-ene; 17α,20R-Epoxypregn-5-ene-3β,21-diol

Identifiers
- IUPAC name: (3S,8R,9S,10R,13S,14S,17R)-3'-(Hydroxymethyl)-10,13-dimethylspiro[1,2,3,4,7,8,9,11,12,14,15,16-dodecahydrocyclopenta[a]phenanthrene-17,2'-oxirane]-3-ol
- PubChem CID: 25154755
- ChemSpider: 24660621

Chemical and physical data
- Formula: C_{21}H_{32}O_{3}
- Molar mass: 332.484 g·mol^{−1}
- 3D model (JSmol): Interactive image
- SMILES: C[C@]12CC[C@@H](CC1=CC[C@@H]3[C@@H]2CC[C@]4([C@H]3CC[C@]45C(O5)CO)C)O
- InChI: InChI=1S/C21H32O3/c1-19-8-5-14(23)11-13(19)3-4-15-16(19)6-9-20(2)17(15)7-10-21(20)18(12-22)24-21/h3,14-18,22-23H,4-12H2,1-2H3/t14-,15+,16-,17-,18?,19-,20-,21-/m0/s1; Key:FMOHTQBFGJULLE-HNFJNZPISA-N

BNN-27, also known as 17α,20R-epoxypregn-5-ene-3β,21-diol, is a synthetic neurosteroid and "microneurotrophin" and analogue of the endogenous neurosteroid dehydroepiandrosterone (DHEA). It acts as a selective, high-affinity, centrally active agonist of the TrkA and p75^{NTR}, receptors for nerve growth factor (NGF) and other neurotrophins, as well as for DHEA and DHEA sulfate (DHEA-S). BNN-27 has neuroprotective and neurogenic effects and has been suggested as a potential novel treatment for neurodegenerative diseases and brain trauma.

In 2011, the surprising discovery was made that DHEA, as well as DHEA-S, directly bind to and activate the TrkA and p75^{NTR} with high affinity. DHEA was subsequently also found to bind to the TrkB and TrkC with high affinity, though it notably activated the TrkC but not the TrkB. DHEA and DHEA-S bound to these receptors with affinities that were in the low nanomolar range (around 5 nM), although the affinities were nonetheless approximately two orders of magnitude lower relative to the highly potent polypeptide neurotrophins (0.01–0.1 nM). In any case, DHEA and DHEA-S were identified as important endogenous neurotrophic factors. These findings may explain the positive association between decreased circulating DHEA levels with age and age-related neurodegenerative diseases.

Subsequently, a series of spiro derivatives of DHEA that had been synthesized and assessed in 2009 as potential neuroprotective agents was re-investigated. Of these, BNN-27 was assayed and found to directly bind to and activate the TrkA and p75^{NTR}. In addition, it was found to cross the blood–brain barrier and to have strong neuroprotective and neurogenic effects in mouse models of neurotoxicity and neurodegeneration. Moreover, unlike DHEA, it lacked any hormonal actions. Also, it was found to lack the problematic hyperalgesic actions of NGF. As such, BNN-27 has been described as an NGF mimetic and was proposed as a potential novel treatment for neurodegenerative diseases and brain trauma.

== See also ==
- Neurotrophin mimetics
- List of neurosteroids
- BNN-20
- Anicequol
