= Estradiol hemisuccinate =

Chemical compound

Clinical data
- Trade names: Eutocol, Hosterona (with progesterone)
- Other names: Estradiol succinate; Estradiol 17β-hemisuccinate; Estradiol 17β-succinate
- Routes of administration: By mouth, intramuscular injection
- Drug class: Estrogen; Estrogen ester

Identifiers
- IUPAC name: 4-{[(17β)-3-Hydroxyestra-1,3,5(10)-trien-17-yl]oxy}-4-oxobutanoic acid
- CAS Number: 7698-93-3
- PubChem CID: 66440
- PubChem SID: 99444362
- DrugBank: DB07891
- ChemSpider: 59813
- UNII: VQV5064VG6
- ChEMBL: ChEMBL1233274
- PDB ligand: HE7 (PDBe, RCSB PDB)
- CompTox Dashboard (EPA): DTXSID00227770
- ECHA InfoCard: 100.163.857

Chemical and physical data
- Formula: C_{22}H_{28}O_{5}
- Molar mass: 372.461 g·mol^{−1}
- 3D model (JSmol): Interactive image
- SMILES: C[C@]12CC[C@@H]3c4ccc(cc4CC[C@H]3[C@@H]1CC[C@@H]2OC(=O)CCC(=O)O)O
- InChI: InChI=1S/C22H28O5/c1-22-11-10-16-15-5-3-14(23)12-13(15)2-4-17(16)18(22)6-7-19(22)27-21(26)9-8-20(24)25/h3,5,12,16-19,23H,2,4,6-11H2,1H3,(H,24,25)/t16-,17-,18+,19+,22+/m1/s1; Key:YJPIDPAGJSWWBE-FNIAAEIWSA-N

Estradiol hemisuccinate (brand name Eutocol), or simply estradiol succinate, also known as estradiol 17β-hemisuccinate, is an estrogen medication and an estrogen ester – specifically, the hemisuccinate ester of estradiol. It is used as a component of hormone replacement therapy for menopause. Like other estrogens, estradiol hemisuccinate has been found to have beneficial effects on the skin, with improvement of skin thickness observed.

Estradiol hemisuccinate is also a component of estradiol hemisuccinate/progesterone (brand name Hosterona), an injectable preparation used to induce withdrawal bleeding in women with amenorrhea.

== See also ==
- Estradiol hemisuccinate/progesterone
- Estriol succinate
- List of estrogen esters § Estradiol esters
