= Estrogen in Venous Thromboembolism Trial =

Randomized controlled trial

- Locations: Norway
- Lead researcher: Else Høibraaten
- Funding: Novo-Nordisk Pharma, Norway Research Forum, Ullevål University Hospital, Oslo, Norway
- Protocol: Randomized, double-blind, and placebo-controlled clinical trial
- Published: 2000
- Article: Høibraaten E, Qvigstad E, Arnesen H, Larsen S, Wickstrøm E, Sandset PM (December 2000). "Increased risk of recurrent venous thromboembolism during hormone replacement therapy--results of the randomized, double-blind, placebo-controlled estrogen in venous thromboembolism trial (EVTET)". Thromb Haemost. 84 (6): 961–7.

The Estrogen in Venous Thromboembolism Trial (EVTET) was a randomized controlled trial (RCT) of menopausal hormone therapy in 140 postmenopausal women with previous history of venous thromboembolism (VTE). It was a double-blind RCT of the estrogen, oral estradiol 2 mg/day, plus the progestogen, norethisterone acetate (NETA) (n=71) 1 mg/day (brand name Kliogest) versus placebo (n=69). The results of the trial were published in 2000 and 2001. The incidence of VTE was 10.7% (8 women) in the hormone therapy group and 2.3% (1 woman) in the placebo group, with all events occurring within 261 days after study inclusion. The difference did not reach statistical significance in the sequential analysis, but was statistically significant if the sequential design was ignored (p = 0.04). Markers of coagulation were likewise increased by hormone therapy. As a result of the high incidence of VTE in the treatment group, the trial was terminated prematurely. The researchers concluded on the basis of their findings that menopausal hormone therapy should not be used in women with a previous history of VTE.

Although the findings of the EVTET and other studies warrant caution concerning the use of oral estrogens in women with past VTE, research has found that transdermal estradiol, in contrast to oral estradiol and other oral estrogens, minimally influences coagulation, and in systematic reviews and meta-analyses of observational studies, has not been associated with increased risk of VTE at doses of up to 100 μg/day. Similarly, a small study found that transdermal estradiol did not influence coagulation in women with prior VTE, and the observational Menopause, Estrogen and Venous Events (MEVE) study found that transdermal estradiol was not associated with increased risk of VTE in postmenopausal women with past VTE (HR = 1.0 (95% CI 0.4–2.4) for transdermal estradiol vs. HR = 6.4 (95% CI 1.5–27.3) for oral estrogens). Accordingly, menopausal hormone therapy guidelines state that transdermal estradiol is likely to have less risk of VTE and recommend use of transdermal estradiol in women with past VTE or at high risk for VTE. However, RCTs are still needed to confirm the findings.

== See also ==
- Menopause, Estrogen and Venous Events (MEVE)
- List of notable clinical studies of menopausal hormone therapy
