= BNN-20 =

Chemical compound

Clinical data
- Other names: BNN20; 17β-Spiro-(androst-5-en-17,2'-oxiran)-3β-ol

Identifiers
- IUPAC name: (3S,8R,9S,10R,13S,14S,17S)-10,13-Dimethylspiro[1,2,3,4,7,8,9,11,12,14,15,16-dodecahydrocyclopenta[a]phenanthrene-17,2'-oxirane]-3-ol
- CAS Number: 847-75-6
- PubChem CID: 44542342
- ChemSpider: 24661247
- UNII: 5WM22TG224
- ChEMBL: ChEMBL1076355

Chemical and physical data
- Formula: C_{20}H_{30}O_{2}
- Molar mass: 302.458 g·mol^{−1}
- 3D model (JSmol): Interactive image
- SMILES: C[C@]12CC[C@@H](CC1=CC[C@@H]3[C@@H]2CC[C@]4([C@H]3CC[C@@]45CO5)C)O
- InChI: InChI=1S/C20H30O2/c1-18-8-5-14(21)11-13(18)3-4-15-16(18)6-9-19(2)17(15)7-10-20(19)12-22-20/h3,14-17,21H,4-12H2,1-2H3/t14-,15+,16-,17-,18-,19-,20+/m0/s1; Key:LKDLANDMNIFZOI-IJMQKCTASA-N

BNN-20, also known as 17β-spiro-(androst-5-en-17,2'-oxiran)-3β-ol, is a synthetic neurosteroid, "microneurotrophin", and analogue of the endogenous neurosteroid dehydroepiandrosterone (DHEA). It acts as a selective, high-affinity, centrally active agonist of the TrkA, TrkB, and p75^{NTR}, receptors for the neurotrophins nerve growth factor (NGF) and brain-derived neurotrophic factor (BDNF), as well as for DHEA and DHEA sulfate (DHEA-S). The drug has been suggested as a potential novel treatment for Parkinson's disease and other conditions.

In 2011, the surprising discovery was made that DHEA, as well as DHEA-S, directly bind to and activate the TrkA and p75^{NTR} with high affinity. DHEA was subsequently also found to bind to the TrkB and TrkC with high affinity, though it notably activated the TrkC but not the TrkB. DHEA and DHEA-S bound to these receptors with affinities that were in the low nanomolar range (around 5 nM), although the affinities were nonetheless approximately two orders of magnitude lower relative to the highly potent polypeptide neurotrophins (0.01–0.1 nM). In any case, DHEA and DHEA-S were identified as important endogenous neurotrophic factors. These findings may explain the positive association between decreased circulating DHEA levels with age and age-related neurodegenerative diseases.

Subsequently, a series of spiro derivatives of DHEA that had been synthesized and assessed in 2009 as potential neuroprotective agents was re-investigated. Of these, BNN-20 was assayed and found to directly bind to and activate the TrkA, TrkB, and p75^{NTR}. In addition, it was found to cross the blood–brain barrier and to have strong neuroprotective effects on dopaminergic neurons in vivo in a mouse model of dopaminergic neurodegeneration, which were dependent, at least in part, on activation of the TrkB. Moreover, unlike DHEA, it lacked any hormonal actions. As such, BNN-20 was described as a BDNF mimetic and was proposed as a potential novel treatment for Parkinson's disease and other conditions, particularly of the neurodegenerative variety, like amyotrophic lateral sclerosis.

== See also ==
- List of neurosteroids
- Anicequol
- BNN-27
