= Itruvone =

Experimental drug

Clinical data
- Other names: PH10; PH10A; PH10 NS; Pregn-4-en-20-yn-3-one
- Routes of administration: Intranasal (spray)
- Drug class: Vomeropherine

Identifiers
- IUPAC name: (8S,9S,10R,13S,14S,17R)-17-ethynyl-10,13-dimethyl-1,2,6,7,8,9,11,12,14,15,16,17-dodecahydrocyclopenta[a]phenanthren-3-one
- CAS Number: 21321-89-1
- PubChem CID: 15633961
- ChemSpider: 18829396
- UNII: 72HML2UK6J
- KEGG: D12542

Chemical and physical data
- Formula: C_{21}H_{28}O
- Molar mass: 296.454 g·mol^{−1}
- 3D model (JSmol): Interactive image
- SMILES: C[C@]12CC[C@H]3[C@H]([C@@H]1CC[C@@H]2C#C)CCC4=CC(=O)CC[C@]34C
- InChI: InChI=1S/C21H28O/c1-4-14-6-8-18-17-7-5-15-13-16(22)9-11-21(15,3)19(17)10-12-20(14,18)2/h1,13-14,17-19H,5-12H2,2-3H3/t14-,17-,18-,19-,20+,21-/m0/s1; Key:CHOUAXDNNAVGHR-NWSAAYAGSA-N

Itruvone (INN; developmental code name PH10), also known as pregn-4-en-20-yn-3-one, is a vomeropherine which is under development by VistaGen Therapeutics as a nasal spray for the treatment of major depressive disorder.

== See also ==
- List of neurosteroids § Pheromones and pherines
- List of investigational antidepressants
- Fasedienol (PH94B; Aloradine)
- Refisolone (PH80, Salubrin)
