= Posovolone =

Chemical compound

Clinical data
- Other names: CO-134444; Co 134444; V-134444; 3β-Hydroxy-21-(1H-imidazol-1-yl)-3α-(methoxymethyl)-5α-pregnan-20-one

Identifiers
- IUPAC name: 1-[(3R,5S,8R,9S,10S,13S,14S,17S)-3-hydroxy-3-(methoxymethyl)-10,13-dimethyl-1,2,4,5,6,7,8,9,11,12,14,15,16,17-tetradecahydrocyclopenta[a]phenanthren-17-yl]-2-imidazol-1-ylethanone
- CAS Number: 256955-84-7
- PubChem CID: 9802683
- ChemSpider: 7978445
- UNII: 1GA9JVO9ZA

Chemical and physical data
- Formula: C_{26}H_{40}N_{2}O_{3}
- Molar mass: 428.617 g·mol^{−1}
- 3D model (JSmol): Interactive image
- SMILES: C[C@]12CC[C@@](C[C@@H]1CC[C@@H]3[C@@H]2CC[C@]4([C@H]3CC[C@@H]4C(=O)CN5C=CN=C5)C)(COC)O
- InChI: InChI=1S/C26H40N2O3/c1-24-10-11-26(30,16-31-3)14-18(24)4-5-19-20-6-7-22(25(20,2)9-8-21(19)24)23(29)15-28-13-12-27-17-28/h12-13,17-22,30H,4-11,14-16H2,1-3H3/t18-,19-,20-,21-,22+,24-,25-,26+/m0/s1; Key:BRVGKZNQWCQKTC-MVCIVNJCSA-N

Posovolone (developmental code name Co 134444) is a synthetic neurosteroid which was under development as a sedative/hypnotic medication for the treatment of insomnia. It is orally active and acts as a GABA_{A} receptor positive allosteric modulator. In animals, posovolone shows anticonvulsant, anxiolytic-like, ataxic, and sleep-promoting effects and appeared to produce effects similar to those of pregnanolone. Development of the agent was started by 1999 and appears to have been discontinued by 2007. In 2021, an INN was registered for posovolone with the descriptor of "antidepressant". Posovolone was originally developed by Purdue Pharma.

== See also ==
- List of investigational antidepressants
- List of investigational insomnia drugs
- List of neurosteroids
