= EIDD-036 =

Chemical compound

Clinical data
- Other names: EPRX-036; Progesterone 20-oxime; P4-20-O; Pregn-4-ene-3,20-dione 20-oxime; 20-(Hydroxyimino)pregn-4-en-3-one
- Drug class: Neurosteroid

Identifiers
- IUPAC name: (8S,9S,10R,13S,14S,17S)-17-[(Z)-N-hydroxy-C-methylcarbonimidoyl]-10,13-dimethyl-1,2,6,7,8,9,11,12,14,15,16,17-dodecahydrocyclopenta[a]phenanthren-3-one
- CAS Number: 211302-60-2
- PubChem CID: 86692077

Chemical and physical data
- Formula: C_{21}H_{31}NO_{2}
- Molar mass: 329.484 g·mol^{−1}
- 3D model (JSmol): Interactive image
- SMILES: C/C(=N/O)/[C@H]1CC[C@@H]2[C@@]1(CC[C@H]3[C@H]2CCC4=CC(=O)CC[C@]34C)C
- InChI: InChI=1S/C21H31NO2/c1-13(22-24)17-6-7-18-16-5-4-14-12-15(23)8-10-20(14,2)19(16)9-11-21(17,18)3/h12,16-19,24H,4-11H2,1-3H3/b22-13-/t16-,17+,18-,19-,20-,21+/m0/s1; Key:WGIMTKVWTJMLDA-ODGMAUQTSA-N

EIDD-036, also known as EPRX-036, as well as progesterone 20-oxime (P4-20-O) or 20-(hydroxyimino)pregn-4-en-3-one, is a synthetic, water-soluble analogue of progesterone, a neurosteroid, and the active metabolite of EIDD-1723 (EPRX-01723), a medication developed for the potential treatment of traumatic brain injury.

== See also ==
- List of neurosteroids § Inhibitory > Synthetic > Pregnanes
- List of progestogen esters § Oximes of progesterone derivatives
