= Cyclopregnol =

Chemical compound

Clinical data
- Other names: Neurosterone; 6β-Hydroxy-3:5-cyclopregnan-20-one

Identifiers
- CAS Number: 465-53-2
- PubChem CID: 12308830
- ChemSpider: 35517184
- UNII: Z06494074X
- CompTox Dashboard (EPA): DTXSID501017011

Chemical and physical data
- Formula: C_{21}H_{32}O_{2}
- Molar mass: 316.485 g·mol^{−1}
- 3D model (JSmol): Interactive image
- SMILES: CC(=O)[C@H]1CC[C@@H]2[C@@]1(CC[C@H]3[C@H]2C[C@H]([C@]45[C@@]3(CC[C@H]4C5)C)O)C
- InChI: InChI=1S/C21H32O2/c1-12(22)15-4-5-16-14-10-18(23)21-11-13(21)6-9-20(21,3)17(14)7-8-19(15,16)2/h13-18,23H,4-11H2,1-3H3/t13-,14-,15+,16-,17-,18+,19+,20+,21+/m0/s1; Key:UGIARLNNAPRCPF-HUPPADNKSA-N

Cyclopregnol (INN), also known as neurosterone, as well as 6β-hydroxy-3:5-cyclopregnan-20-one, is a synthetic pregnane steroid which was developed in the 1950s as a "psychotropic agent" for the treatment of mental disorders but was never marketed. Although an initial small clinical study found effectiveness, a subsequent, larger and more rigorous study found that cyclopregnol was no more effective than placebo and was clearly inferior to chlorpromazine.

== See also ==
- List of neurosteroids
