= Marla Ahlgrimm =

American medical writer, pharmacist, philanthropist

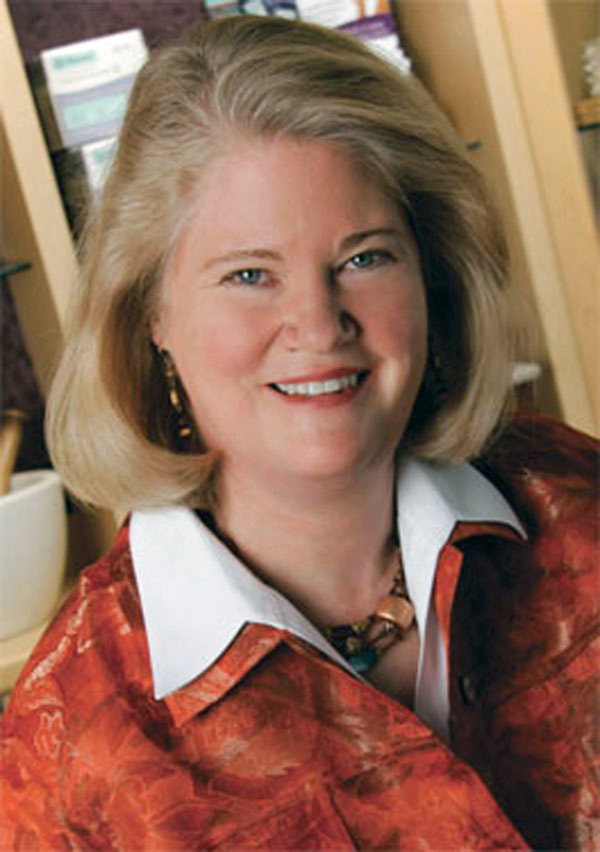
- Born: Marla Jane Ahlgrimm
- Education: University of Wisconsin School of Pharmacy
- Occupations: Pharmacist; Author
- Known for: Expert in Women's Hormonal Health
- Website: Marla Ahlgrimm Official Website

Marla Ahlgrimm is an American entrepreneur, author, philanthropist, pharmacist and expert in women's hormonal health. She is the author of The HRT Solution: Optimizing Your Hormone Potential, which details the benefits of bioidentical hormone therapy and the book Self-Help For Premenstrual Syndrome. She is a frequent lecturer, has been featured as an expert in numerous professional journals and consumer magazines and has appeared on regional and national television and radio broadcasts.

Ahlgrimm is the co-founder of Madison Pharmacy Associates, the first pharmacy in the United States devoted to women's health. She is also the founder of Women's Health America and is currently the President of Cyclin Pharmaceuticals.

== Career ==
Ahlgrimm began her career at a local pharmacy in Madison, Wisconsin. During her time there, she identified symptoms that affected some of her patients severely. She identified these symptoms as premenstrual syndrome (PMS), prior to PMS being widely used as a term in the United States. Her early research was inspired by British physician Dr. Katharina Dalton who coined the term PMS during the 1950s.

Ahlgrimm co-founded Madison Pharmacy Associates in 1982. Madison Pharmacy Associates was the first pharmacy in the United States specializing in women's health. She is considered a pioneer in the diagnosis and treatment of premenstrual syndrome, developing many of the bioidentical hormone therapy prescription options used today for hormone imbalance. She was one of the first to identify hormone testing options to understand individual hormone levels in women allowing for customization of hormone dosing. Ahlgrimm and her staff at Madison Pharmacy Associates provided care to women concerned with PMS, perimenopause, menopause, as well as specialized nutritional supplements and low dose, customized natural hormone prescription therapy. In 1997, she purchased competitor Bajamar Pharmacy, whose vice president praised Ahlgrimm stating, "She's more dedicated to women's health than anyone else I've met."

Ahlgrimm is also the founder of Women's Health America and sits on the UW-Madison School of Pharmacy Board of Visitors.

== Bibliography ==
- 2012, HRT Solution, Revised Edition (Avery Health Guides), Avery Trade, ISBN 158333176X
- 1999, Self-Help For Premenstrual Syndrome, Random House Publishing, ISBN 978-0-679-77800-4
- 1998, The HRT Solution: Optimizing Your Hormone Potential, Avery, ISBN 0895299488
