= 11-Dehydroprogesterone =

Chemical compound

Clinical data
- Other names: Pregna-4,11-diene-3,20-dione

Identifiers
- IUPAC name: (8S,9S,10R,13S,14S,17S)-17-Acetyl-10,13-dimethyl-1,2,6,7,8,9,14,15,16,17-decahydrocyclopenta[a]phenanthren-3-one
- CAS Number: 2625-60-7
- PubChem CID: 228863
- ChemSpider: 199223
- UNII: YUL6GTR69Y
- KEGG: C14646
- ChEBI: CHEBI:34929
- ChEMBL: ChEMBL44282
- CompTox Dashboard (EPA): DTXSID90180885

Chemical and physical data
- Formula: C_{21}H_{28}O_{2}
- Molar mass: 312.453 g·mol^{−1}
- 3D model (JSmol): Interactive image
- SMILES: CC(=O)[C@H]1CC[C@@H]2[C@@]1(C=C[C@H]3[C@H]2CCC4=CC(=O)CC[C@]34C)C
- InChI: InChI=1S/C21H28O2/c1-13(22)17-6-7-18-16-5-4-14-12-15(23)8-10-20(14,2)19(16)9-11-21(17,18)3/h9,11-12,16-19H,4-8,10H2,1-3H3/t16-,17+,18-,19-,20-,21+/m0/s1; Key:XMUAORABVRJUDU-LEKSSAKUSA-N

11-Dehydroprogesterone, also known as pregna-4,11-diene-3,20-dione, is a steroidal progestin that was never marketed. It was found to be 2- to 3-fold as potent as progesterone as a progestogen in animal bioassays, although other studies found them to be equivalent in potency. 11-Dehydroprogesterone has been studied in women. It was discovered in the 1930s or 1940s, and was one of the earliest synthetic progestogens.

== See also ==
- 17α-Methylprogesterone
- 19-Norprogesterone
