= Papyrus 17 =

Papyrus 𝔓^{17}
- New Testament manuscript
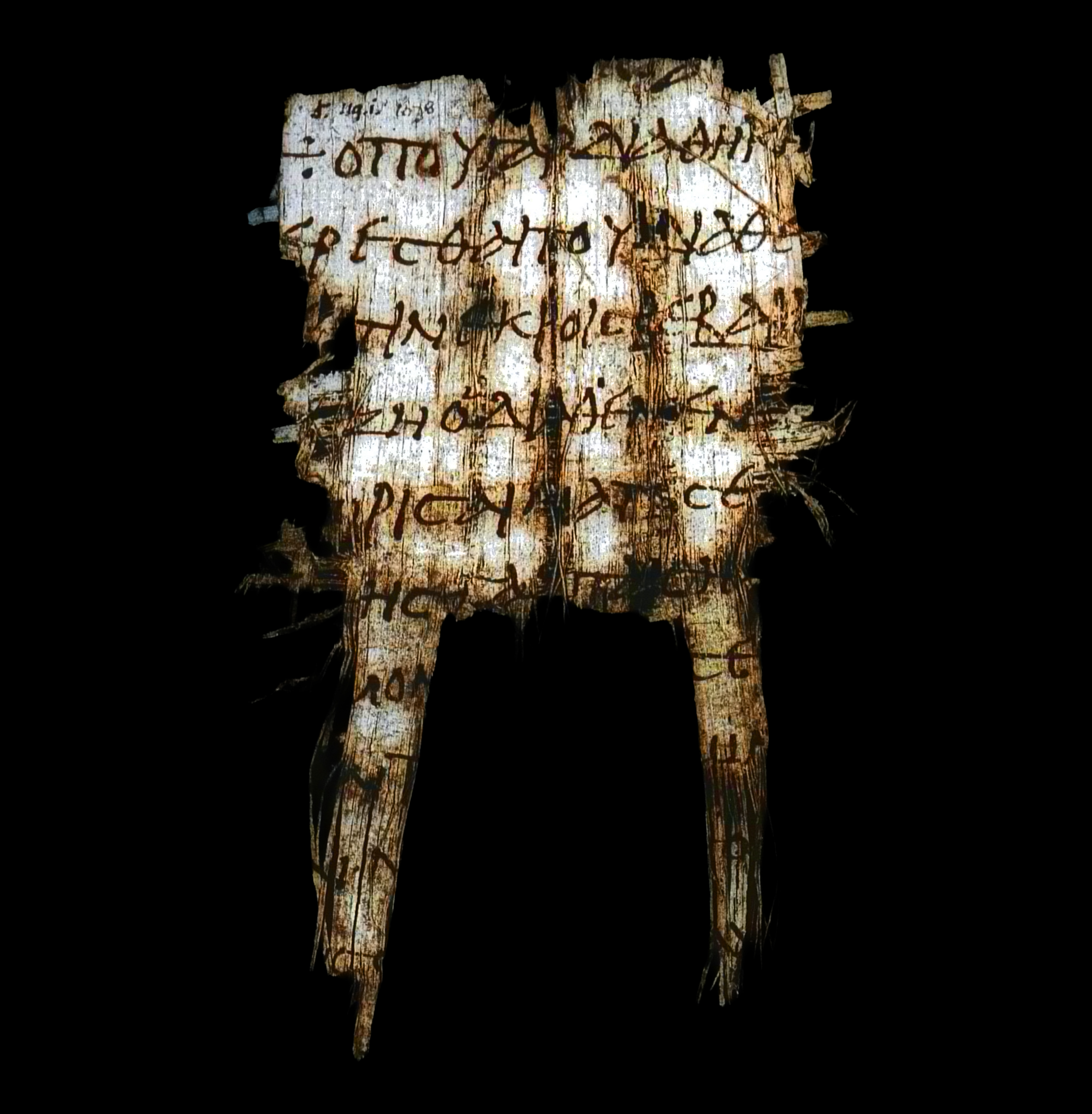
- Verso Hebrews 9, 15–19
- Name: P. Oxy. 1078
- Text: Hebrews 9 †
- Date: 4th century
- Script: Greek
- Found: Egypt, Lord Crawford
- Now at: Cambridge University
- Cite: B. P. Grenfell & A. S. Hunt, Oxyrhynchus Papyri VIII, (London 1911), pp. 11-13
- Size: 14.2 x 8.4 cm
- Type: Alexandrian text-type
- Category: II

Papyrus 17 (in the Gregory-Aland numbering), signed by 𝔓^{17}, is an early copy of the New Testament in Greek. It is a papyrus manuscript of the Epistle to the Hebrews, but only contains verses 9:12–19. The manuscript has been paleographically assigned to the 4th century. However, according to Philip Comfort it is from the late 3rd century.

== Description ==
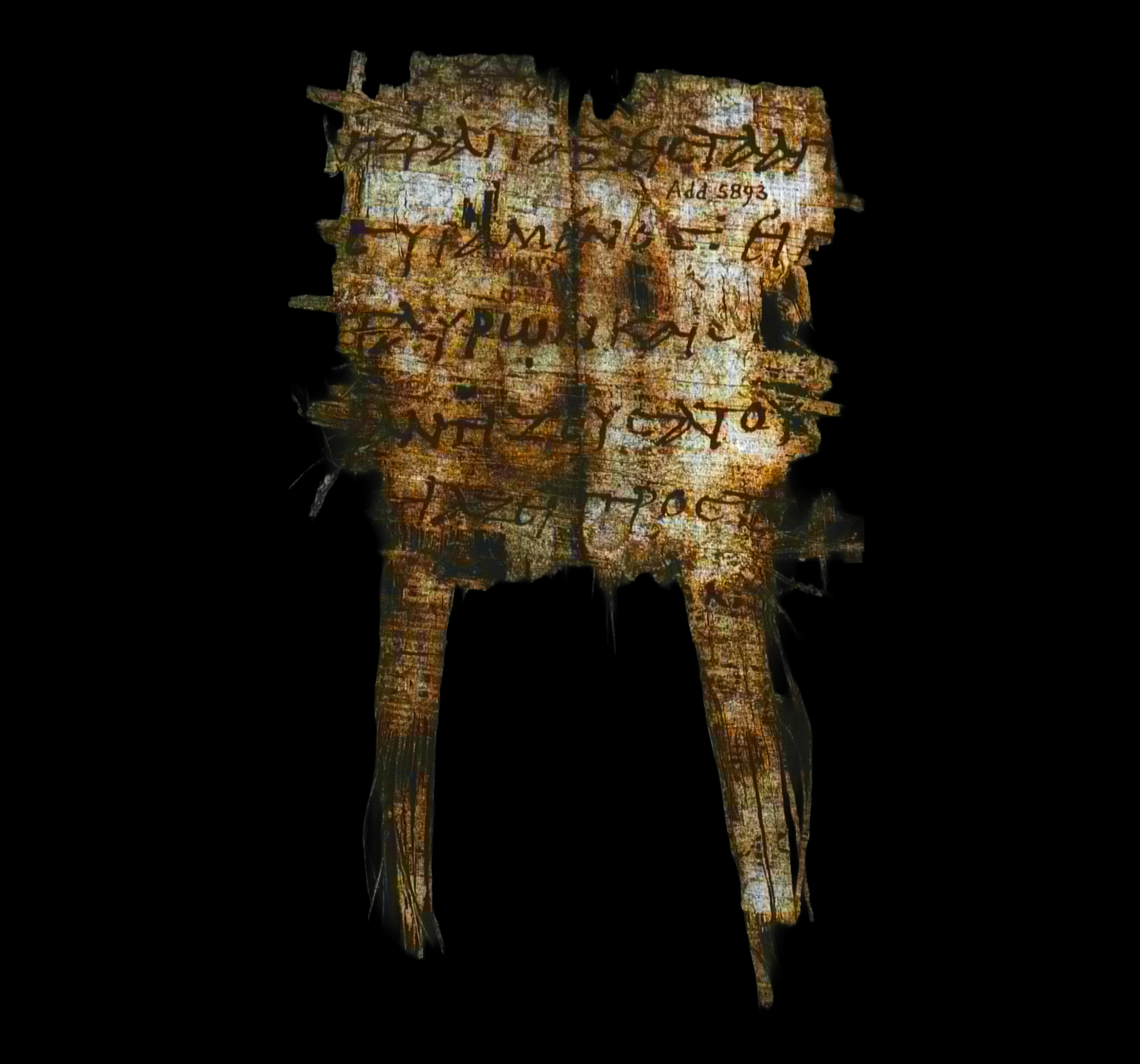
Recto Hebrews 9, 12–14

The leaf is in fragmentary condition (originally 19 by 25 cm). The text fills in where Codex Vaticanus is vacant (from Hebrews 9:14).

The Nomina Sacra are used throughout. The scribe used marks for punctuation between verses 12 and 13, and between 15 and 16. It has no iotacistic errors.

The Greek text of this codex is representative of the Alexandrian text-type. Aland placed it in Category II.

It was discovered by Lord Crawford in Egypt. The text was edited in 1911 by Grenfell and Hunt.

Currently housed at the Cambridge University Library (Add. 5893) in Cambridge.

== See also ==
- List of New Testament papyri
