= Pregna-4,20-dien-3,6-dione =

Chemical compound

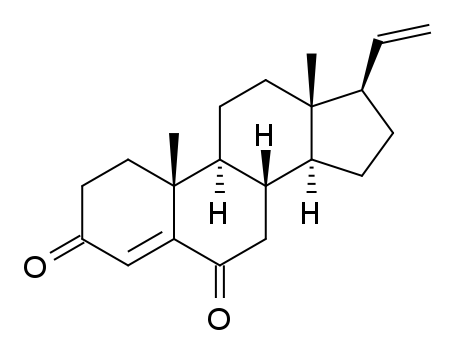

Clinical data
- Other names: Pregna-4,20-diene-3,6-dione
- ATC code: None

Identifiers
- IUPAC name: (8S,9S,10R,13R,14S,17R)-17-ethenyl-10,13-dimethyl-2,7,8,9,11,12,14,15,16,17-decahydro-1H-cyclopenta[a]phenanthrene-3,6-dione
- CAS Number: 177349-73-4
- PubChem CID: 15429665
- ChemSpider: 21375166
- CompTox Dashboard (EPA): DTXSID701032869

Chemical and physical data
- Formula: C_{21}H_{28}O_{2}
- Molar mass: 312.453 g·mol^{−1}
- 3D model (JSmol): Interactive image
- SMILES: C[C@]12CC[C@H]3[C@H]([C@@H]1CC[C@@H]2C=C)CC(=O)C4=CC(=O)CC[C@]34C
- InChI: InChI=1S/C21H28O2/c1-4-13-5-6-16-15-12-19(23)18-11-14(22)7-9-21(18,3)17(15)8-10-20(13,16)2/h4,11,13,15-17H,1,5-10,12H2,2-3H3/t13-,15-,16-,17-,20+,21+/m0/s1; Key:CNHWGARUXXETPK-SMWYYAGTSA-N

Pregnadienedione (PDD), or pregna-4,20-dien-3,6-dione, is a steroid and pherine, or synthetic pheromone. PDD has been found to activate the vomeronasal organ in men. Moreover, inhalation by men has been found to affect autonomic and central function and to lower luteinizing hormone and testosterone levels, while inhalation by women has few or no effects.

== See also ==
- List of neurosteroids § Pheromones and pherines
