= Fasedienol =

Chemical compound

Clinical data
- Other names: PH94B; Aloradine; 4-Androstadienol; 3β-Androsta-4,16-dien-3-ol, Androsta-4,16-dien-3β-ol; Androstadienol
- Routes of administration: Intranasal
- Drug class: Vomeropherine
- ATC code: None

Identifiers
- IUPAC name: (3S,8S,9S,10R,13R,14S)-10,13-Dimethyl-2,3,6,7,8,9,11,12,14,15-decahydro-1H-cyclopenta[a]phenanthren-3-ol
- CAS Number: 23062-06-8
- PubChem CID: 9925482
- DrugBank: DB04968
- ChemSpider: 8101117
- UNII: DTW1NJ7IJH
- KEGG: D12524
- CompTox Dashboard (EPA): DTXSID901032322

Chemical and physical data
- Formula: C_{19}H_{28}O
- Molar mass: 272.432 g·mol^{−1}
- 3D model (JSmol): Interactive image
- SMILES: C[C@]12CC[C@H]3[C@H]([C@@H]1CC=C2)CCC4=C[C@H](CC[C@]34C)O
- InChI: InChI=1S/C19H28O/c1-18-9-3-4-16(18)15-6-5-13-12-14(20)7-11-19(13,2)17(15)8-10-18/h3,9,12,14-17,20H,4-8,10-11H2,1-2H3/t14-,15-,16-,17-,18-,19-/m0/s1; Key:NYVFCEPOUVGTNP-DYKIIFRCSA-N

Fasedienol (INN; developmental code names PH94B and Aloradine), also known as 4-androstadienol or as 4,16-androstadien-3β-ol, is a pherine which is under development by VistaGen Therapeutics in a nasal spray formulation used as needed(PRN) for the acute treatment of social anxiety disorder. It is also being investigated by VistaGen Therapeutics for the treatment of generalized anxiety disorder (GAD) and post-traumatic stress disorder (PTSD). The pherine is a positional isomer of the endogenous pheromone androstadienol (5-androstadienol or 5,16-androstadien-3β-ol). Fasedienol failed to show effectiveness in phase 3 clinical trials.

Fasedienol lacks affinity for steroid hormone receptors and has instead been found to directly activate isolated human vomeronasal receptor cells at nanomolar concentrations (EC_{50} = 200 nM).

The closely related pheromone androstenol (5α-androst-16-en-3α-ol) has been found to act as a potent positive allosteric modulator of the GABA_{A} receptor, and it has been proposed that this action may mediate its pheromone effects. It produces anxiolytic-like effects in animals. Androstadienol, androstadienone, and androstenone, all of which are also pheromones, have been found to be converted into androstenol, and as such, it may be responsible for their pheromone effects. As fasedienol is very closely related structurally to androstadienol, it might be converted into androstenol similarly and hence potentiation of the GABA_{A} receptor could contribute to its mechanism of action.

== See also ==
- List of neurosteroids § Pheromones and pherines
- List of investigational anxiolytics
- Refisolone (PH80, Salubrin)
- Itruvone (PH10)
