= Anicequol =

Chemical compound

Clinical data
- Other names: NGA0187; NGD-187; 16β-Acetoxy-3β,7β,11β-trihydroxy-5α-ergost-22E-en-6-one

Identifiers
- IUPAC name: [(3S,5S,7R,8S,9S,10R,11S,13S,14S,16S,17R)-17-[(E,2R,5R)-5,6-Dimethylhept-3-en-2-yl]-3,7,11-trihydroxy-10,13-dimethyl-6-oxo-1,2,3,4,5,7,8,9,11,12,14,15,16,17-tetradecahydrocyclopenta[a]phenanthren-16-yl] acetate
- CAS Number: 163565-48-8
- PubChem CID: 10413810
- ChemSpider: 8589244
- UNII: 5HJL84XH3J
- ChEMBL: ChEMBL1770668
- CompTox Dashboard (EPA): DTXSID201045471

Chemical and physical data
- Formula: C_{30}H_{48}O_{6}
- Molar mass: 504.708 g·mol^{−1}
- 3D model (JSmol): Interactive image
- SMILES: C[C@H](/C=C/[C@H](C)C(C)C)[C@H]1[C@H](C[C@@H]2[C@@]1(C[C@@H]([C@H]3[C@H]2[C@H](C(=O)[C@@H]4[C@@]3(CC[C@@H](C4)O)C)O)O)C)OC(=O)C
- InChI: InChI=1S/C30H48O6/c1-15(2)16(3)8-9-17(4)25-23(36-18(5)31)13-20-24-26(22(33)14-30(20,25)7)29(6)11-10-19(32)12-21(29)27(34)28(24)35/h8-9,15-17,19-26,28,32-33,35H,10-14H2,1-7H3/b9-8+/t16-,17+,19-,20-,21+,22-,23-,24-,25-,26-,28+,29-,30-/m0/s1; Key:LWMKDRSIMLTGDK-TZEVRYHJSA-N

Anicequol (developmental code names NGA0187, NGD-187) is a naturally occurring ergostane steroid produced by Acremonium sp. TF-0356 which has nerve growth factor-like neurotrophic activity. It was under investigation by Taisho Pharmaceutical in Japan for the treatment of cognitive disorders in the 1990s, but development was discontinued and the drug was never marketed.

== See also ==
- BNN-20
- BNN-27
- Sarsasapogenin
