= Dalzanemdor =

Chemical compound

Clinical data
- Other names: SAGE-718
- Routes of administration: Oral
- Drug class: NMDA receptor positive allosteric modulator; Neurosteroid
- ATC code: None

Legal status
- Legal status: Investigational

Identifiers
- IUPAC name: (3S,8R,9S,10R,13R,14S,17R)-3,13-Dimethyl-17-[(2R,5S)-6,6,6-trifluoro-5-hydroxy-5-methylhexan-2-yl]-2,4,7,8,9,10,11,12,14,15,16,17-dodecahydro-1H-cyclopenta[a]phenanthren-3-ol
- CAS Number: 2311911-06-3
- PubChem CID: 134452289
- ChemSpider: 129243339
- KEGG: D12788
- ChEMBL: ChEMBL5197411

Chemical and physical data
- Formula: C_{26}H_{41}F_{3}O_{2}
- Molar mass: 442.607 g·mol^{−1}
- 3D model (JSmol): Interactive image
- SMILES: C[C@H](CC[C@@](C)(C(F)(F)F)O)[C@H]1CC[C@@H]2[C@@]1(CC[C@H]3[C@H]2CC=C4[C@@H]3CC[C@](C4)(C)O)C
- InChI: InChI=1S/C26H41F3O2/c1-16(9-14-25(4,31)26(27,28)29)21-7-8-22-20-6-5-17-15-23(2,30)12-10-18(17)19(20)11-13-24(21,22)3/h5,16,18-22,30-31H,6-15H2,1-4H3/t16-,18+,19-,20-,21-,22+,23+,24-,25+/m1/s1; Key:RTBRKGVJBGKMFF-YMEFNWBESA-N

Dalzanemdor (INN; development code SAGE-718) is experimental drug that was previously investigated for the treatment of neurological disorders and cognitive impairment. It acts as a positive allosteric modulator of the NMDA receptor, whose activity is essential for learning, memory, and cognition. Dalzanemdor is an analogue of the neurosteroid 24S-hydroxycholesterol.

As of 2022, dalzanemdor is in Phase II clinical trials for Alzheimer's disease, Parkinson's disease, and Huntington's disease. As of 2024, Sage Therapeutics had discontinued development of dalzanemdor following negative clinical trial results.
