= Collaborative Group on Hormonal Factors in Breast Cancer =

Academic organization

The Collaborative Group on Hormonal Factors in Breast Cancer (CGHFBC) is a group of scientific researchers who conduct meta-analyses of the worldwide epidemiological evidence on risk factors for breast cancer in women. It formed in 1992. Their earliest publications were a 1996 meta-analysis of 54 studies on hormonal birth control and breast cancer risk and a 1997 meta-analysis of 51 studies on menopausal hormone therapy and breast cancer risk. One of their recent publications was a 2019 meta-analysis of menopausal hormone therapy and breast cancer risk based on type and timing of therapy. In 2012, the group concluded in a meta-analysis of 117 studies that the incidence of breast cancer was increased by each year younger at menarche and each year older at menopause.
