= Early versus Late Intervention Trial with Estradiol =

US clinical trial

The Early versus Late Intervention Trial with Estradiol (ELITE) was a large randomized controlled trial that assessed the timing hypothesis that menopausal hormone therapy in early but not late menopause would improve cardiovascular outcomes.
