= Pherine =

Synthetic neuroactive steroids

Pherines, also known as vomeropherines, are odorless synthetic neuroactive steroids that engage nasal chemosensory receptors and induce dose-dependent and reversible pharmacological and behavioral effects. Pherines target human chemosensory receptors and possibly other receptors such as the GABA_{A} receptor and influence central nervous system activity.

Currently known pherine molecules are being developed for the treatment of various medical conditions. Pherines specifically target nasal chemosensory cells and mediate selective modulation of brain areas like the limbic amygdala, hypothalamus, hippocampus, and prefrontal cortex. In clinical trials, pherines formulated for intranasal administration in ultra low doses (nanogram to low microgram quantities) showed rapid onset of efficacy (10–15 minutes) and an excellent safety and tolerability profile. Pherines are also minimally invasive (do not require systemic absorption) to exert their pharmacological effects and can be used on demand

Pherines described in the scientific literature include PH10, PH15, PH80, PH284 and fasedienol (PH94B, Aloradine, or 4,16-androstadien-3β-ol, a positional isomer of androstadienol). Pherines are chemically and pharmacologically different from natural pheromones including androstadienone, androstenone, androstenol, androsterone, and estratetraenol.

== Examples of pherines ==
- Fasedienol (PH94B; Aloradine; 4,16-androstadien-3β-ol) is an investigational new drug proposed for the acute treatment of social anxiety disorder.
- PH10 is being developed as an indication for the acute treatment of depression.
- PH80. In clinical trials this pherine molecule showed efficacy to relieve premenstrual symptoms and it is also being studied for its beneficial effect to reduce menopausal hot flashes.
- PH15 is in early stage development for the treatment of cognitive impairment.

== See also ==
- List of neurosteroids
