= Postmenopausal Estrogen/Progestin Interventions =

The Postmenopausal Estrogen/Progestin Interventions (PEPI) trial was a large randomized controlled trial which assessed the influence of menopausal hormone therapy on cardiovascular and other outcomes.
