= 17-Phenylandrostenol =

Chemical compound

Clinical data
- Other names: (3α,5α)-17-Phenyl-androst-16-en-3-ol

Identifiers
- IUPAC name: (3R,5S,8R,9S,10S,13S,14S)-10,13-dimethyl-17-phenyl- 2,3,4,5,6,7,8,9,11,12,14,15-dodecahydro-1H-cyclopenta[a]phenanthren-3-ol
- CAS Number: 694438-95-4
- PubChem CID: 25068278
- ChemSpider: 21475142

Chemical and physical data
- Formula: C_{25}H_{34}O
- Molar mass: 350.546 g·mol^{−1}
- 3D model (JSmol): Interactive image
- SMILES: C[C@]12CC[C@H](C[C@@H]1CC[C@@H]3[C@@H]2CC[C@]4([C@H]3CC=C4C5=CC=CC=C5)C)O
- InChI: InChI=1S/C25H34O/c1-24-14-12-19(26)16-18(24)8-9-20-22-11-10-21(17-6-4-3-5-7-17)25(22,2)15-13-23(20)24/h3-7,10,18-20,22-23,26H,8-9,11-16H2,1-2H3/t18-,19+,20-,22-,23-,24-,25+/m0/s1; Key:SINAMTXBCYKFDL-WBJZGETLSA-N

17-Phenylandrostenol (17-PA), or (3α,5α)-17-phenylandrost-16-en-3-ol, is a steroid drug which binds to GABA_{A} receptors. It acts as an antagonist against the sedative effects of neuroactive steroids, but has little effect when administered by itself, and does not block the effects of benzodiazepines or barbiturates.

== See also ==
- Androstenol
