= Allopregnanediol =

Names
- IUPAC name 5α-Pregnane-3α,20α-diol
- Systematic IUPAC name (1S,3aS,3bR,5aS,7R,9aS,9bS,11aS)-1-[(1S)-1-Hydroxyethyl]-9a,11a-dimethylhexadecahydro-1H-cyclopenta[a]phenanthren-7-ol

Identifiers
CAS Number	566-58-5
3D model (JSmol)	Interactive image
ChEBI	CHEBI:8387
ChEMBL	ChEMBL269897
ChemSpider	190585
EC Number	201-313-7
KEGG	C05484; D00189
PubChem CID	219833
UNII	97N2Q625GO
CompTox Dashboard (EPA)	DTXSID40859115
- InChI: InChI=1S/C21H36O2/c1-13(22)17-6-7-18-16-5-4-14-12-15(23)8-10-20(14,2)19(16)9-11-21(17,18)3/h13-19,22-23H,4-12H2,1-3H3/t13-,14+,15+,16-,17+,18-,19-,20-,21+/m0/s1 Key: YWYQTGBBEZQBGO-BERLURQNSA-N
- SMILES: C[C@@H]([C@H]1CC[C@@H]2[C@@]1(CC[C@H]3[C@H]2CC[C@H]4[C@@]3(CC[C@H](C4)O)C)C)O

Properties
Chemical formula	C_{21}H_{36}O_{2}
Molar mass	320.517 g·mol^{−1}
- Except where otherwise noted, data are given for materials in their standard state (at 25 °C [77 °F], 100 kPa). Infobox references

Allopregnanediol, or 5α-pregnane-3α,20α-diol, is an endogenous metabolite of progesterone and allopregnanolone and an isomer of pregnanediol (5β-pregnan-3α,20α-diol). It has been found to act like a partial agonist of an allosteric site of the GABA receptor and hence might play a biological role as a neurosteroid. It has also been found to act as an agonist of the human pregnane X receptor, albeit with an EC_{50} that is more than an order of magnitude lower than that of other endogenous pregnanes like pregnenolone, pregnanediol, allopregnanedione, and allopregnanolone.
