= Pregnanetriol =

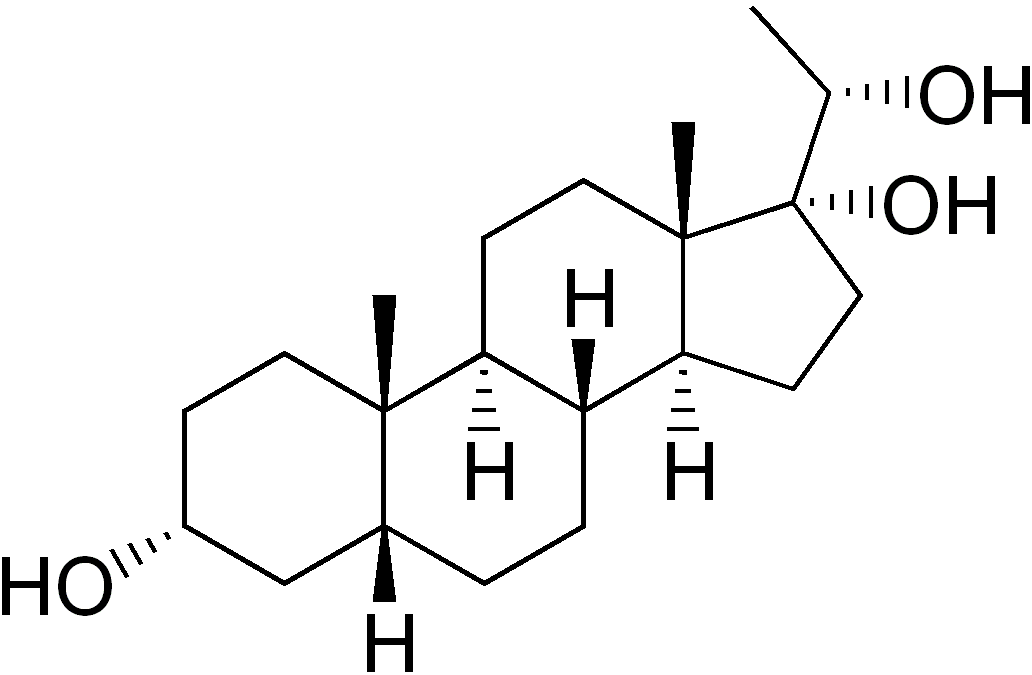

Names
- IUPAC name (20S)-5β-Pregnane-3α,17,20-triol
- Systematic IUPAC name (1R,3aS,3bR,5aR,7R,9aS,9bS,11aS)-1-[(1S)-1-Hydroxyethyl]-9a,11a-dimethylhexadecahydro-1H-cyclopenta[a]phenanthrene-1,7-diol
- Other names 5β-Pregnane-3α,17α,20α-triol

Identifiers
CAS Number	1098-45-9
3D model (JSmol)	Interactive image
ChemSpider	92121
ECHA InfoCard	100.012.862
PubChem CID	101967
UNII	43822S61TB
CompTox Dashboard (EPA)	DTXSID00911364
- InChI: InChI=1S/C21H36O3/c1-13(22)21(24)11-8-18-16-5-4-14-12-15(23)6-9-19(14,2)17(16)7-10-20(18,21)3/h13-18,22-24H,4-12H2,1-3H3/t13-,14+,15+,16+,17-,18-,19-,20-,21-/m0/s1 Key: SCPADBBISMMJAW-UHHUKTEYSA-N; InChI=1/C21H36O3/c1-13(22)21(24)11-8-18-16-5-4-14-12-15(23)6-9-19(14,2)17(16)7-10-20(18,21)3/h13-18,22-24H,4-12H2,1-3H3/t13-,14+,15+,16+,17-,18-,19-,20-,21-/m0/s1 Key: SCPADBBISMMJAW-UHHUKTEYBG
- SMILES: O[C@H]4C[C@@H]3[C@]([C@@H]1[C@H]([C@H]2[C@](C)(CC1)[C@@](O)([C@@H](O)C)CC2)CC3)(C)CC4

Properties
Chemical formula	C_{21}H_{36}O_{3}
Molar mass	336.516 g·mol^{−1}
- Except where otherwise noted, data are given for materials in their standard state (at 25 °C [77 °F], 100 kPa). verify (what is ?) Infobox references

Pregnanetriol, or 5β-pregnane-3α,17α,20α-triol, is a steroid and inactive metabolite of progesterone.

== Urine testing ==
Urine excretion of pregnanetriol can be measured over a period of 24 hours. Elevated urine pregnanetriol levels suggest adrenogenital syndrome. In monitoring treatment with cortisol replacement, elevated urine pregnanetriol levels indicate insufficient dosage of cortisol.

=== Reference ranges ===
For females:

- 0 to 5 years: < 0.1 mg/24 hours
- 6 to 9 years: < 0.3 mg/24 hours
- 10 to 15 years: 0.1 to 0.6 mg/24 hours
- 16 years and older: 0 to 1.4 mg/ 24 hours.

For males:

- 0 to 5 years: < 0.1 mg/24 hours
- 6 to 9 years: < 0.3 mg/24 hours
- 10 to 15 years: 0.2 to 0.6 mg/24 hours
- 16 years and older: 0.2 to 2 mg/ 24 hours

== See also ==
Pregnanetriolone
