= Pregnanediol =

Names
- IUPAC name (3R,5R,8R,9S,10S,13S,14S,17S)-17-[(1S)-1-Hydroxyethyl]-10,13-dimethyl-2,3,4,5,6,7,8,9,11,12,14,15,16,17-tetradecahydro-1H-cyclopenta[a]phenanthren-3-ol
- Other names 5β-Pregnane-3α,20α-diol; Pregnandiol

Identifiers
CAS Number	80-92-2
3D model (JSmol)	Interactive image
ChEMBL	ChEMBL269897
ChemSpider	190585
ECHA InfoCard	100.001.195
KEGG	C05484
PubChem CID	219833
UNII	JR3JD1Y22C
CompTox Dashboard (EPA)	DTXSID6046218
- InChI: InChI=1S/C21H36O2/c1-13(22)17-6-7-18-16-5-4-14-12-15(23)8-10-20(14,2)19(16)9-11-21(17,18)3/h13-19,22-23H,4-12H2,1-3H3/t13-,14+,15+,16-,17+,18-,19-,20-,21+/m0/s1 Key: YWYQTGBBEZQBGO-BERLURQNSA-N; InChI=1/C21H36O2/c1-13(22)17-6-7-18-16-5-4-14-12-15(23)8-10-20(14,2)19(16)9-11-21(17,18)3/h13-19,22-23H,4-12H2,1-3H3/t13-,14+,15+,16-,17+,18-,19-,20-,21+/m0/s1 Key: YWYQTGBBEZQBGO-BERLURQNBW
- SMILES: O[C@@H]4CC[C@]3([C@H](CC[C@H]2[C@@H]1CC[C@@H]([C@@]1(C)CC[C@@H]23)[C@@H](O)C)C4)C

Properties
Chemical formula	C_{21}H_{36}O_{2}
Molar mass	320.517 g·mol^{−1}
- Except where otherwise noted, data are given for materials in their standard state (at 25 °C [77 °F], 100 kPa). verify (what is ?) Infobox references

Pregnanediol, or 5β-pregnane-3α,20α-diol, is an inactive metabolic product of progesterone. A test can be done to measure the amount of pregnanediol in urine, which offers an indirect way to measure progesterone levels in the body.

From the urine of pregnant women from London clinics, Guy Frederic Marrian isolated a substance that contained two hydroxyl groups and could be converted into a diacetate with acetic anhydride. However, the formula had not been clearly clarified. Almost at the same time, Adolf Butenandt at the Chemical University Laboratory in Göttingen investigated the constituents of pregnant urine and clarified the structure of the diol. The name pregnandiol, coined by Butenandt, is derived from the Latin verb praegnans (pregnant) or the English pregnant and pregnancy. This gave rise to the name pregnane for the underlying parent hydrocarbon.

In 1936, Venning and Browne demonstrated the presence of pregnanediol, specifically the glucuronide of pregnanediol in pregnancy urine. Their study extracted pregnanediol from pregnancy urine and revealed that pregnanediol concentration in urine indicates the amount of progesterone excreted. Since progesterone levels indicate the functionality of a corpus luteum, and pregnanediol concentration represents 40-45% of the progesterone excreted, estimations of pregnanediol reveal the functionality of a corpus luteum. However, pregnanediol concentrations vary with menstrual cycle phases, so it is essential to consider the menstrual cycle phase when examining them. Furthermore, current research has demonstrated that pregnanediol concentration in urine is also a measure of ovarian activity.

== See also ==
- Pregnanedione
- Progesterone (pregn-4-ene-3,20-dione)
