= C21H32O2 =

The molecular formula C_{21}H_{32}O_{2} (molar mass: 316.47 g/mol, exact mass: 316.2402 u) may refer to:

- Bolasterone
- Calusterone
- Cannabigerol
- Cyclopregnol
- 8,9-Dihydrocannabidiol
- Dihydroprogesterones
  - 3α-Dihydroprogesterone
  - 3β-Dihydroprogesterone
  - 5α-Dihydroprogesterone
  - 5β-Dihydroprogesterone
  - 20α-Dihydroprogesterone
  - 20β-Dihydroprogesterone
- Ethyltestosterone
- Ethynylandrostanediol
  - 17α-Ethynyl-3α-androstanediol (a synthetic androstane steroid)
  - 17α-Ethynyl-3β-androstanediol (a synthetic estrogen steroid)
- Hexahydrocannabinol
- Methylstenbolone
- Norbolethone, an anabolic steroid
- Pregnenolone
