= 3-oxo-5beta-steroid 4-dehydrogenase =

Class of enzymes

3-oxo-5-beta-steroid 4-dehydrogenase

Identifiers
- EC no.: 1.3.99.6
- CAS no.: 9067-97-4

Databases
- IntEnz: IntEnz view
- BRENDA: BRENDA entry
- ExPASy: NiceZyme view
- KEGG: KEGG entry
- MetaCyc: metabolic pathway
- PRIAM: profile
- PDB structures: RCSB PDB PDBe PDBsum
- Gene Ontology: AmiGO / QuickGO
Search
- PMC: articles
- PubMed: articles
- NCBI: proteins

In enzymology, 3-oxo-5beta-steroid 4-dehydrogenase (EC 1.3.99.6) is an enzyme that catalyzes the chemical reaction

a 3-oxo-5beta-steroid + acceptor $\rightleftharpoons$ a 3-oxo-Delta_{4}-steroid + reduced acceptor

For example, the enzyme acts on 5β-dihydroprogesterone to give progesterone.

5β-Dihydroprogesterone
+ electron acceptor
Progesterone
+ reduced acceptor

This enzyme belongs to the family of oxidoreductases, to be specific, those acting on the CH-CH group of donor with other acceptors. The systematic name of this enzyme class is 3-oxo-5beta-steroid:acceptor Delta4-oxidoreductase. This enzyme is also called 3-oxo-5beta-steroid:(acceptor) Delta4-oxidoreductase. This enzyme participates in 3 metabolic pathways: bile acid biosynthesis, c21-steroid hormone metabolism, and androgen and estrogen metabolism.
