= 3beta-hydroxy-5beta-steroid dehydrogenase =

Enzyme

Identifiers
- EC no.: 1.1.1.277

Databases
- IntEnz: IntEnz view
- BRENDA: BRENDA entry
- ExPASy: NiceZyme view
- KEGG: KEGG entry
- MetaCyc: metabolic pathway
- PRIAM: profile
- PDB structures: RCSB PDB PDBe PDBsum
Search
- PMC: articles
- PubMed: articles
- NCBI: proteins

In enzymology, 3beta-hydroxy-5beta-steroid dehydrogenase (EC 1.1.1.277) is an enzyme that catalyzes the chemical reaction

Epipregnanolone
+ NADP^{+}
H^{+}
H^{+}
5β-Dihydroprogesterone
+ NADPH

The two substrates of this enzyme are epipregnanolone and oxidised nicotinamide adenine dinucleotide phosphate (NADP^{+}). Its products are 5β-dihydroprogesterone, reduced NADPH, and a proton.

This enzyme belongs to the family of oxidoreductases, specifically those acting on the CH-OH group of donor with NAD^{+} or NADP^{+} as acceptor. The systematic name of this enzyme class is 3beta-hydroxy-5beta-steroid:NADP^{+} 3-oxidoreductase. Other names in common use include 3beta-hydroxysteroid 5beta-oxidoreductase, and 3beta-hydroxysteroid 5beta-progesterone oxidoreductase.
