= 3beta-hydroxy-5alpha-steroid dehydrogenase =

Enzyme

3β-hydroxy-5α-steroid dehydrogenase

Identifiers
- EC no.: 1.1.1.278
- CAS no.: 9015-81-0

Databases
- IntEnz: IntEnz view
- BRENDA: BRENDA entry
- ExPASy: NiceZyme view
- KEGG: KEGG entry
- MetaCyc: metabolic pathway
- PRIAM: profile
- PDB structures: RCSB PDB PDBe PDBsum
- Gene Ontology: AmiGO / QuickGO
Search
- PMC: articles
- PubMed: articles
- NCBI: proteins

In enzymology, 3β-hydroxy-5α-steroid dehydrogenase (EC 1.1.1.278) is an enzyme that catalyzes the chemical reaction

Isopregnanolone
+ NADP^{+}
H^{+}
H^{+}
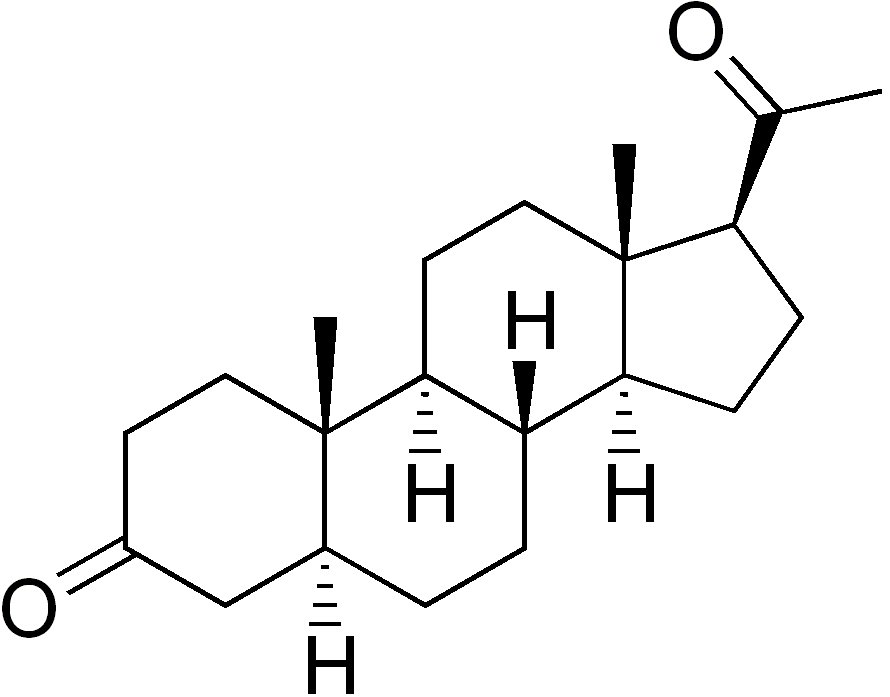
5α-Dihydroprogesterone
+ NADPH

Thus, the two substrates of this enzyme are isopregnanolone and oxidised nicotinamide adenine dinucleotide phosphate (NADP^{+}). Its products are 5α-dihydroprogesterone, reduced NADPH, and a proton.

This enzyme belongs to the family of oxidoreductases, specifically those acting on the CH-OH group of donor with NAD^{+} or NADP^{+} as acceptor. The systematic name of this enzyme class is 3β-hydroxy-5α-steroid:NADP^{+} 3-oxidoreductase.
