= Golexanolone =

Chemical compound

Clinical data
- Other names: GR-3027; 3α-Ethynyl-3β-hydroxyandrostan-17E-one oxime

Identifiers
- IUPAC name: (3S,5S,8R,9S,10S,13S,14S,17E)-3-Ethynyl-17-hydroxyimino-10,13-dimethyl-2,4,5,6,7,8,9,11,12,14,15,16-dodecahydro-1H-cyclopenta[a]phenanthren-3-ol
- CAS Number: 2089238-18-4
- PubChem CID: 132190533
- ChemSpider: 76826990
- UNII: 9C48F08TP2

Chemical and physical data
- Formula: C_{21}H_{31}NO_{2}
- Molar mass: 329.484 g·mol^{−1}
- 3D model (JSmol): Interactive image
- SMILES: C[C@]12CC[C@](C[C@@H]1CC[C@@H]3[C@@H]2CC[C@]\4([C@H]3CC/C4=N\O)C)(C#C)O
- InChI: InChI=1S/C21H31NO2/c1-4-21(23)12-11-19(2)14(13-21)5-6-15-16-7-8-18(22-24)20(16,3)10-9-17(15)19/h1,14-17,23-24H,5-13H2,2-3H3/b22-18+/t14-,15-,16-,17-,19-,20-,21-/m0/s1; Key:FFIBGVYTWNPLPN-BZLGYYABSA-N

Golexanolone, also known by the developmental code name GR-3027, is a neurosteroid medication which is under development for the treatment of hypersomnia and hepatic encephalopathy. It acts as a negative allosteric modulator of the GABA_{A} receptor. The medication selectively antagonizes the stimulatory actions of inhibitory neurosteroids like allopregnanolone and tetrahydrodeoxycorticosterone (THDOC) at the GABA_{A} receptor, while not affecting the activation of the GABA_{A} receptor by γ-aminobutyric acid (GABA).

== See also ==
- List of investigational narcolepsy and hypersomnia drugs
- List of neurosteroids § Excitatory
- Sepranolone (isopregnanolone)
