= 3α-Dihydroprogesterone =

Names
- IUPAC name 3α-Hydroxypregn-4-en-20-one
- Systematic IUPAC name 1-[(1S,3aS,3bS,7R,9aR,9bS,11aS)-7-Hydroxy-9a,11a-dimethyl-2,3,3a,3b,4,5,7,8,9,9a,9b,10,11,11a-tetradecahydro-1H-cyclopenta[a]phenanthren-1-yl]ethan-1-one
- Other names 3α-Dihydroprogesterone

Identifiers
CAS Number	25680-68-6
3D model (JSmol)	Interactive image
ChemSpider	108793
PubChem CID	121951
UNII	6U8M6JFV3W
CompTox Dashboard (EPA)	DTXSID50948564
- InChI: InChI=1S/C21H32O2/c1-13(22)17-6-7-18-16-5-4-14-12-15(23)8-10-20(14,2)19(16)9-11-21(17,18)3/h12,15-19,23H,4-11H2,1-3H3/t15-,16+,17-,18+,19+,20+,21-/m1/s1 Key: QWVWXRKHAXWWSV-QYYVTAPASA-N
- SMILES: CC(=O)[C@H]1CC[C@@H]2[C@@]1(CC[C@H]3[C@H]2CCC4=C[C@@H](CC[C@]34C)O)C

Properties
Chemical formula	C_{21}H_{32}O_{2}
Molar mass	316.485 g·mol^{−1}
- Except where otherwise noted, data are given for materials in their standard state (at 25 °C [77 °F], 100 kPa). Infobox references

3α-Dihydroprogesterone (3α-DHP), also known as 3α-hydroxyprogesterone, as well as pregn-4-en-3α-ol-20-one, is an endogenous neurosteroid. It is biosynthesized by 3α-hydroxysteroid dehydrogenase from progesterone. 3α-DHP has been found to act as a positive allosteric modulator of the GABA_{A} receptor and is described as being as active as allopregnanolone in regard to this action. In accordance, it has anxiolytic effects in animals. 3α-DHP has also been found to inhibit the secretion of follicle-stimulating hormone (FSH) from the rat pituitary gland, demonstrating possible antigonadotropic properties. Unlike the case of most other inhibitory neurosteroids, 3α-DHP production is not blocked by 5α-reductase inhibitors like finasteride. No data were available on the progestogenic activity of 3α-DHP as of 1977. Levels of 5α-DHP have been quantified.

== See also ==
- 3β-Dihydroprogesterone
- 5α-Dihydroprogesterone
- 5β-Dihydroprogesterone
- Pregnanolone
- Pregnenolone
