= Cortisone alpha-reductase =

Class of enzymes

cortisone alpha-reductase

Identifiers
- EC no.: 1.3.1.4
- CAS no.: 9029-09-8

Databases
- IntEnz: IntEnz view
- BRENDA: BRENDA entry
- ExPASy: NiceZyme view
- KEGG: KEGG entry
- MetaCyc: metabolic pathway
- PRIAM: profile
- PDB structures: RCSB PDB PDBe PDBsum
- Gene Ontology: AmiGO / QuickGO
Search
- PMC: articles
- PubMed: articles
- NCBI: proteins

In enzymology, a cortisone alpha-reductase (EC 1.3.1.4) is an enzyme that catalyzes the chemical reaction

4,5alpha-dihydrocortisone + NADP^{+} $\rightleftharpoons$ cortisone + NADPH + H^{+}

Thus, the two substrates of this enzyme are 4,5alpha-dihydrocortisone and NADP^{+}, whereas its 3 products are cortisone, NADPH, and H^{+}.

This enzyme belongs to the family of oxidoreductases, specifically those acting on the CH-CH group of donor with NAD+ or NADP+ as acceptor. The systematic name of this enzyme class is 4,5alpha-dihydrocortisone:NADP+ Delta4-oxidoreductase. Other names in common use include cortisone Delta4-5alpha-reductase, microsomal steroid reductase (5alpha), Delta4-3-ketosteroid reductase (5alpha), Delta4-3-oxosteroid-5alpha-reductase, NADPH:Delta4-3-oxosteroid-5alpha-oxidoreductase, and Delta4-5alpha-reductase.
