= C27H44O8 =

The molecular formula C_{27}H_{44}O_{8} (molar mass: 496.63 g/mol, exact mass: 496.3036 u) may refer to:

- Pregnanediol glucuronide
- Turkesterone
