= Brexanolone caprilcerbate =

Clinical data
- Other names: LYT-300; LYT300; SPT-300; SPT300; Allopregnanolone 3-O-caprilcerbate
- Routes of administration: Oral
- Drug class: GABA_{A} receptor positive allosteric modulator; Neurosteroid

Identifiers
- IUPAC name: 1-[1,3-bis(octanoyloxy)propan-2-yl] 5-[({[(20-oxo-5α-pregnan3α-yl)oxy]carbonyl}oxy)methyl] 3-methylpentanedioate
- CAS Number: 2681264-65-1
- PubChem CID: 158098654
- UNII: K3KLQ9T6WM

Chemical and physical data
- Formula: C_{48}H_{76}O_{12}
- Molar mass: 845.124 g·mol^{−1}
- 3D model (JSmol): Interactive image
- SMILES: CCCCCCCC(=O)OCC(COC(=O)CCCCCCC)OC(=O)CC(C)CC(=O)OCOC(=O)O[C@@H]1CC[C@]2([C@H](C1)CC[C@@H]3[C@@H]2CC[C@]4([C@H]3CC[C@@H]4C(=O)C)C)C
- InChI: InChI=1S/C48H78O12/c1-7-9-11-13-15-17-42(50)55-30-37(31-56-43(51)18-16-14-12-10-8-2)59-45(53)28-33(3)27-44(52)57-32-58-46(54)60-36-23-25-47(5)35(29-36)19-20-38-40-22-21-39(34(4)49)48(40,6)26-24-41(38)47/h33,35-41H,7-32H2,1-6H3/t33?,35-,36+,38-,39+,40-,41-,47-,48+/m0/s1; Key:UURJDSKJYJCKFM-MGZMNYTESA-N

Brexanolone caprilcerbate (INN; developmental code names LYT-300, SPT-300) is an orally active prodrug of brexanolone (allopregnanolone) which is under development for the treatment of anxiety disorders. It is a absorbed via the lymphatic system with oral administration. The drug is being developed by Seaport Therapeutics and PureTech Health. As of January 2025, it is in phase 2 clinical trials.

== See also ==
- List of investigational anxiolytics
