= 5α-Dihydroprogesterone =

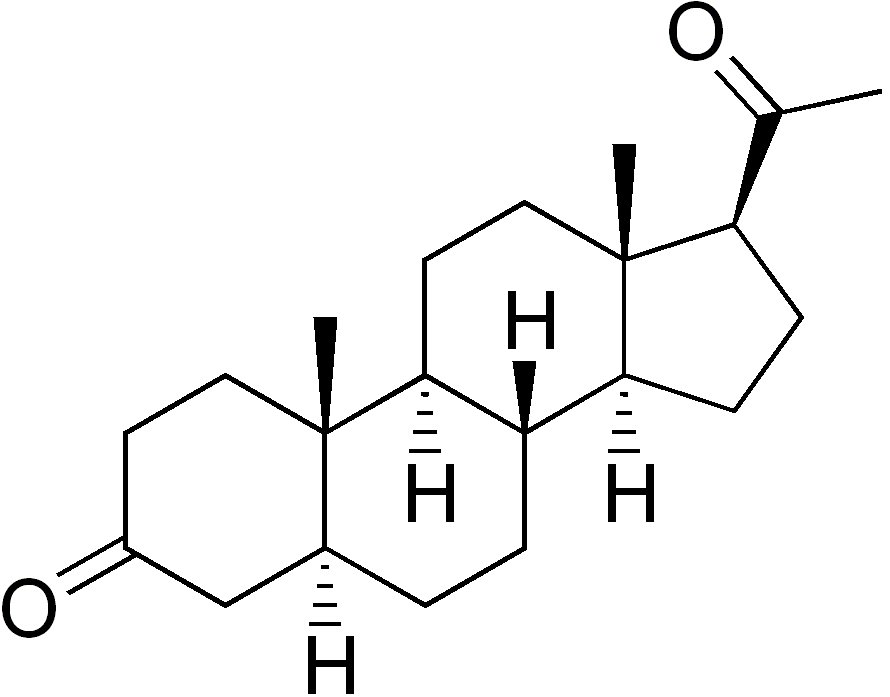

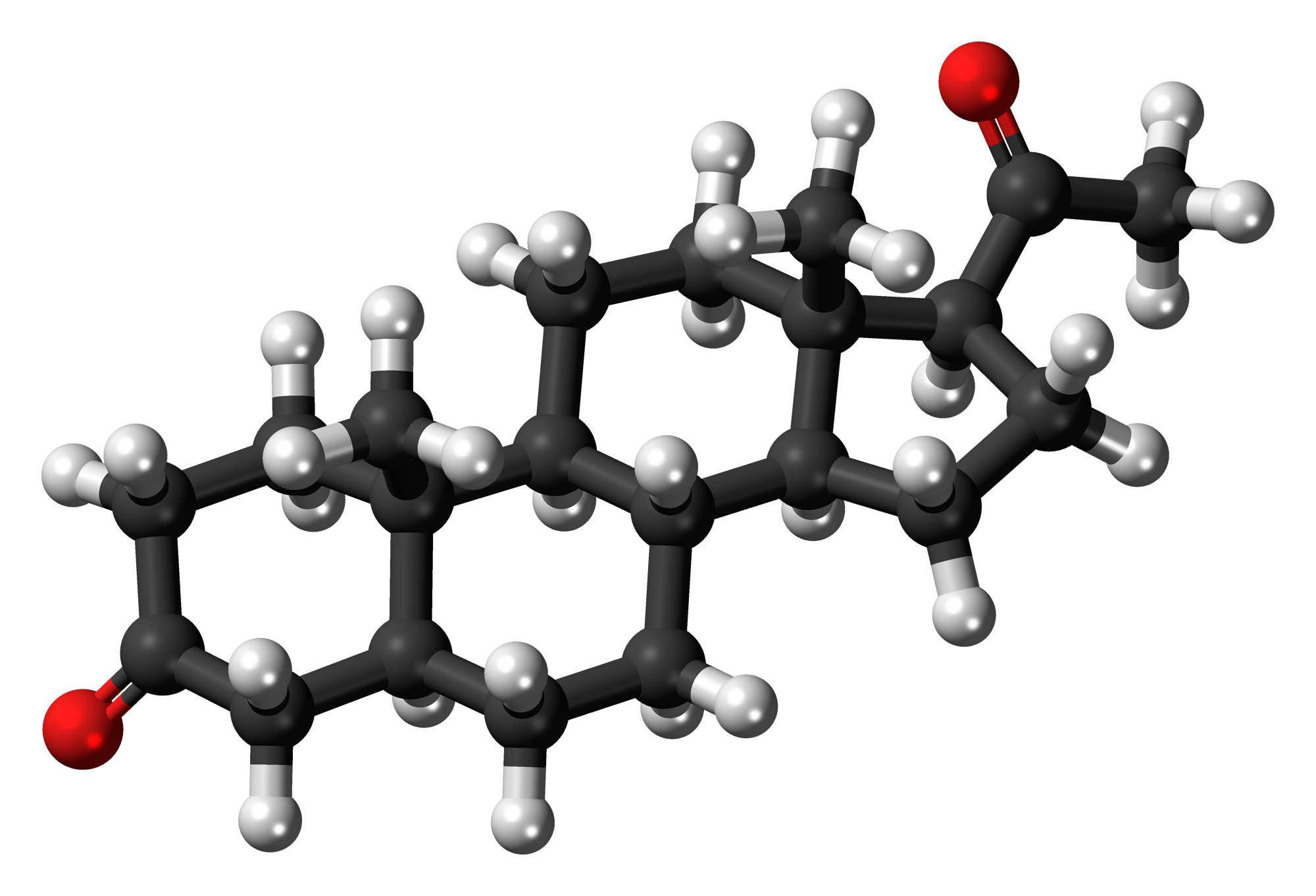

Names
- IUPAC name 5α-Pregnane-3,20-dione
- Systematic IUPAC name (1S,3aS,3bR,5aS,9aS,9bS,11aS)-1-Acetyl-9a,11a-dimethylhexadecahydro-7H-cyclopenta[a]phenanthren-7-one
- Other names Allopregnanedione

Identifiers
CAS Number	566-65-4
3D model (JSmol)	Interactive image
ChEBI	CHEBI:28952
ChemSpider	83782
ECHA InfoCard	100.008.453
PubChem CID	92810
UNII	98G4S1OH0Z
CompTox Dashboard (EPA)	DTXSID301017277
- InChI: InChI=1S/C21H32O2/c1-13(22)17-6-7-18-16-5-4-14-12-15(23)8-10-20(14,2)19(16)9-11-21(17,18)3/h14,16-19H,4-12H2,1-3H3/t14-,16-,17+,18-,19-,20-,21+/m0/s1 Key: XMRPGKVKISIQBV-BJMCWZGWSA-N
- SMILES: CC(=O)[C@H]1CC[C@@H]2[C@@]1(CC[C@H]3[C@H]2CC[C@@H]4[C@@]3(CCC(=O)C4)C)C

Properties
Chemical formula	C_{21}H_{32}O_{2}
Molar mass	316.485 g·mol^{−1}
- Except where otherwise noted, data are given for materials in their standard state (at 25 °C [77 °F], 100 kPa). Infobox references

5α-Dihydroprogesterone (5α-DHP, allopregnanedione, or 5α-pregnane-3,20-dione) is an endogenous progestogen and neurosteroid that is synthesized from progesterone. It is also an intermediate in the synthesis of allopregnanolone and isopregnanolone from progesterone.

5α-DHP is metabolized by the aldo-keto reductases (AKRs) AKR1C1, AKR1C2, and AKR1C4 with high catalytic efficiency. AKR1C1 preferentially forms 20α-hydroxy-5α-pregnane-3-one while AKR1C2 preferentially forms allopregnanolone. Similarly AKR1C1 reduces and consequently inactivates allopregnanolone into 5α-pregnane-3α,20α-diol. In contrast to the other AKRs, AKR1C3 has low catalytic efficiency for reduction of 5α-DHP. These AKRs are highly expressed in the human liver and mammary gland but have relatively modest expression in the human brain and uterus.

5α-DHP is an agonist of the progesterone receptor and a positive allosteric modulator of the GABA_{A} receptor (albeit with an affinity for this receptor that is regarded as relatively low (in comparison to 3α-hydroxylated progesterone metabolites such as allopregnanolone and pregnanolone)). It has also been found to act as a negative allosteric modulator of the GABA_{A}-rho receptor. The steroid has been found to possess 82% of the affinity of progesterone for the progesterone receptor in rhesus monkey uterus. 5α-Dihydroprogesterone has been said to possess about 33% of the relative progestogenic potency of progesterone. In addition, it is a weak agonist of the pregnane X receptor (PXR) (EC_{50} >10,000 μM), with approximately six-fold lower potency relative to its 5β-isomer, 5β-dihydroprogesterone.

Allopregnanolone is transformed back into 5α-DHP by 3α-hydroxysteroid oxidoreductase, and conversion of allopregnanolone into 5α-DHP is responsible for the progestogenic activity of allopregnanolone. 5α-DHP, via the progesterone receptor, and allopregnanolone, via the GABA_{A} receptor, act together to induce lordosis in animals. A study found that 41% of allopregnanolone that was administered via injection was transformed into 5α-DHP in the rat brain.

Levels of 5α-DHP have been quantified.

== See also ==
- 3α-Dihydroprogesterone
- Epipregnanolone
- 3β-Dihydroprogesterone
- Allopregnanediol
