= 5β-Dihydroprogesterone =

Names
- IUPAC name 5β-Pregnane-3,20-dione
- Systematic IUPAC name (1S,3aS,3bR,5aR,9aS,9bS,11aS)-1-Acetyl-9a,11a-dimethylhexadecahydro-7H-cyclopenta[a]phenanthren-7-one
- Other names Pregnanedione

Identifiers
CAS Number	128-23-4
3D model (JSmol)	Interactive image
ChEBI	CHEBI:30154
ChEMBL	ChEMBL486954
ChemSpider	83723
DrugBank	DB07557
IUPHAR/BPS	2759
KEGG	C05479
PubChem CID	92745
UNII	105J2Q45A0
CompTox Dashboard (EPA)	DTXSID00878589
- InChI: InChI=1S/C21H32O2/c1-13(22)17-6-7-18-16-5-4-14-12-15(23)8-10-20(14,2)19(16)9-11-21(17,18)3/h14,16-19H,4-12H2,1-3H3/t14-,16+,17-,18+,19+,20+,21-/m1/s1 Key: XMRPGKVKISIQBV-XWOJZHJZSA-N
- SMILES: CC(=O)[C@H]1CC[C@@H]2[C@@]1(CC[C@H]3[C@H]2CC[C@H]4[C@@]3(CCC(=O)C4)C)C

Properties
Chemical formula	C_{21}H_{32}O_{2}
Molar mass	316.485 g·mol^{−1}
- Except where otherwise noted, data are given for materials in their standard state (at 25 °C [77 °F], 100 kPa). Infobox references

5β-Dihydroprogesterone (5β-DHP, pregnanedione, or 5β-pregnane-3,20-dione) is an endogenous neurosteroid and an intermediate in the biosynthesis of pregnanolone and epipregnanolone from progesterone. It is synthesized from progesterone by the enzyme 5β-reductase.

5β-DHP has been found to act as a positive allosteric modulator of the GABA_{A} receptor (albeit with an affinity for this receptor regarded as relatively low in comparison to 3α-hydroxylated progesterone metabolites such as pregnanolone and allopregnanolone) and also as a negative allosteric modulator of the GABA_{A}-rho receptor. In accordance with the former action, it has been found to possess anesthetic, anxiolytic, and antinociceptive effects. 5β-DHP has been found to act as an agonist of the pregnane X receptor (PXR) as well (albeit weakly (EC_{50} >10,000 μM)), and has been found to regulate uterine contractility through activation of this receptor. Unlike 5α-dihydroprogesterone, 5β-DHP possesses only very weak affinity for the progesterone receptor (1.2% of that of progesterone in rhesus monkey uterus), and in relation to this, is not a notable progestogen.

A study found that 5β-DHP, but not progesterone, directly bound to and antagonized the oxytocin receptor at nanomolar concentrations, and it was suggested that this may be one of the mechanisms by which progesterone maintains pregnancy. However, a subsequent study was unable to replicate this finding, and there has been no further investigation since. In any case, 5β-DHP has nonetheless been shown to possess tocolytic effects in animals, and this may alternatively be mediated by activation of the PXR.

== See also ==
- 5α-Dihydroprogesterone
- 3α-Dihydroprogesterone
- Isopregnanolone
- 3β-Dihydroprogesterone
