= Pregnanolone =

Names
- IUPAC name 3α-Hydroxy-5β-pregnan-20-one
- Systematic IUPAC name 1-[(1S,3aS,3bR,5aR,7R,9aS,9bS,11aS)-7-Hydroxy-9a,11a-dimethylhexadecahydro-1H-cyclopenta[a]phenanthren-1-yl]ethan-1-one
- Other names Eltanolone; 5β-Pregnan-3α-ol-20-one; 3α,5β-Tetrahydroprogesterone; 3α,5β-THP; 3α-Hydroxy-5β-tetrahydroprogesterone

Identifiers
CAS Number	128-20-1
3D model (JSmol)	Interactive image
ChEBI	CHEBI:1712
ChEMBL	ChEMBL210952
ChemSpider	29132
ECHA InfoCard	100.162.192
PubChem CID	31402
UNII	BXO86P3XXW
CompTox Dashboard (EPA)	DTXSID1046342
- InChI: InChI=1S/C21H34O2/c1-13(22)17-6-7-18-16-5-4-14-12-15(23)8-10-20(14,2)19(16)9-11-21(17,18)3/h14-19,23H,4-12H2,1-3H3/t14-,15-,16+,17-,18+,19+,20+,21-/m1/s1 Key: AURFZBICLPNKBZ-YZRLXODZSA-N; InChI=1/C21H34O2/c1-13(22)17-6-7-18-16-5-4-14-12-15(23)8-10-20(14,2)19(16)9-11-21(17,18)3/h14-19,23H,4-12H2,1-3H3/t14-,15-,16+,17-,18+,19+,20+,21-/m1/s1 Key: AURFZBICLPNKBZ-YZRLXODZBF
- SMILES: CC(=O)[C@H]1CC[C@@H]2[C@@]1(CC[C@H]3[C@H]2CC[C@H]4[C@@]3(CC[C@H](C4)O)C)C

Properties
Chemical formula	C_{21}H_{34}O_{2}
Molar mass	318.501 g·mol^{−1}

Pharmacology
Routes of administration	Intravenous injection
- Pharmacokinetics
Biological half-life	0.9–3.5 hours
- Except where otherwise noted, data are given for materials in their standard state (at 25 °C [77 °F], 100 kPa). Infobox references

Pregnanolone, also known as eltanolone, is an endogenous inhibitory neurosteroid which is produced in the body from progesterone. It is closely related to allopregnanolone, which has similar properties.

== Biological activity ==
Pregnanolone is a positive allosteric modulator of the GABA_{A} receptor, as well as a negative allosteric modulator of the glycine receptor.

== Biological function ==
Pregnanolone has sedative, anxiolytic, anesthetic, and anticonvulsant effects. During pregnancy, pregnanolone and allopregnanolone are involved in sedation and anesthesia of the fetus.

== Biochemistry ==
Pregnanolone is synthesized from progesterone via the enzymes 5β-reductase and 3α-hydroxysteroid dehydrogenase, with 5β-dihydroprogesterone occurring as a metabolic intermediate. The elimination half-life of pregnanolone is between 0.9 and 3.5 hours.

== Chemistry ==
Pregnanolone, also known as 3α,5β-tetrahydroprogesterone (3α,5β-THP) or as 5β-pregnan-3α-ol-20-one, is a naturally occurring pregnane steroid and a derivative of progesterone. Related compounds include allopregnanolone (3α,5α-THP; brexanolone), epipregnanolone (3β,5β-THP), hydroxydione, isopregnanolone (3β,5α-THP), and renanolone.

== History ==
Pregnanolone was first isolated from the urine of pregnant women in 1937. Its anesthetic properties were first demonstrated in animals in 1957.

== Research ==
Pregnanolone was investigated for clinical use as a general anesthetic under the name eltanolone (INN), but produced unwanted side effects such as convulsions on occasion, and for this reason, was never marketed.
