= Progesterone =

Sex hormone

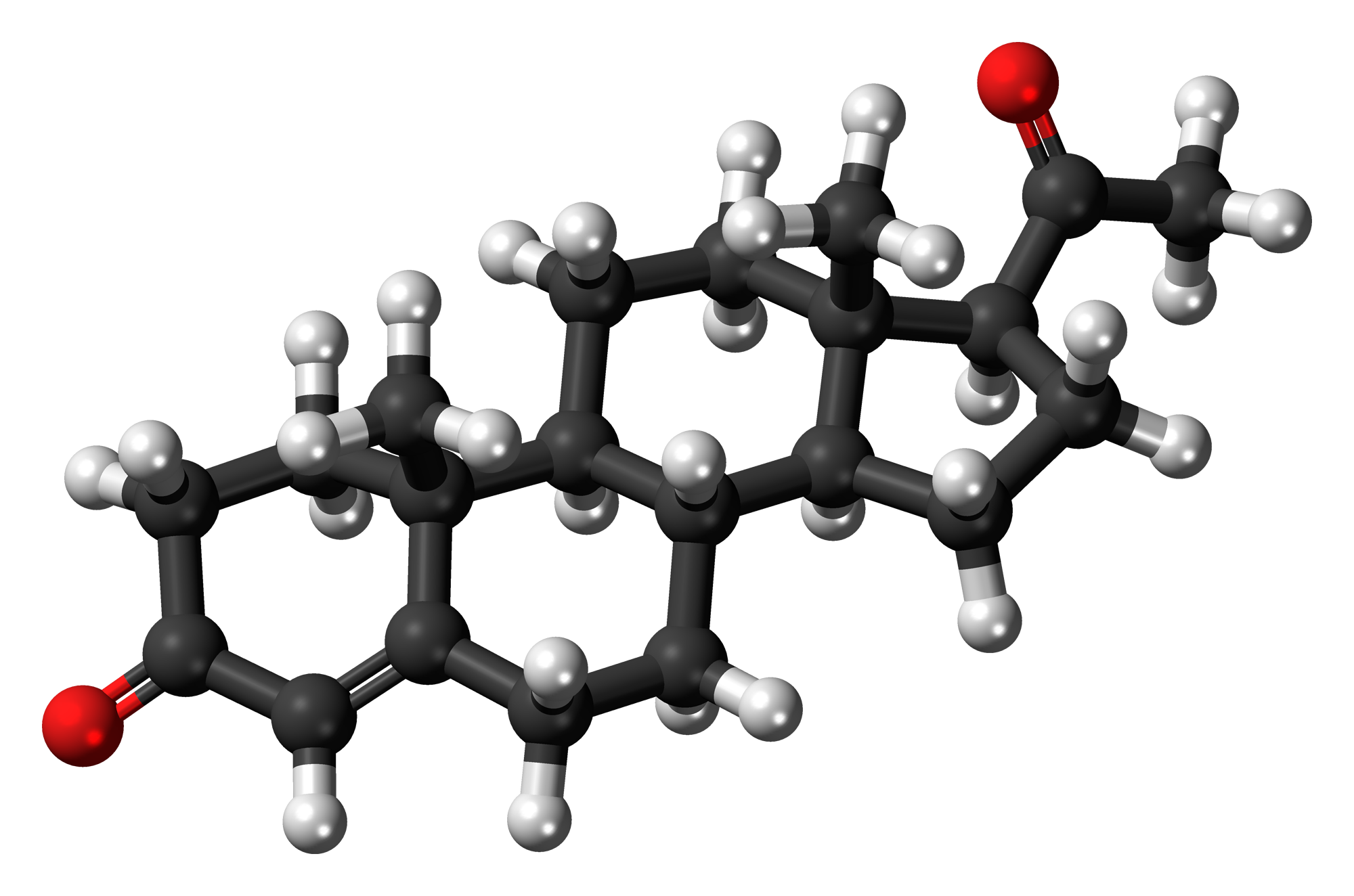

Names
- IUPAC name Pregn-4-ene-3,20-dione
- Systematic IUPAC name (1S,3aS,3bS,9aR,9bS,11aS)-1-Acetyl-9a,11a-dimethyl-1,2,3,3a,3b,4,5,8,9,9a,9b,10,11,11a-tetradecahydro-7H-cyclopenta[a]phenanthren-7-one
- Other names P4; Pregnenedione

Identifiers
CAS Number	57-83-0
3D model (JSmol)	Interactive image
ChEBI	CHEBI:17026
ChEMBL	ChEMBL103
ChemSpider	5773
DrugBank	DB00396
ECHA InfoCard	100.000.318
KEGG	C00410
PubChem CID	5994
UNII	4G7DS2Q64Y
CompTox Dashboard (EPA)	DTXSID3022370
- InChI: InChI=1S/C21H30O2/c1-13(22)17-6-7-18-16-5-4-14-12-15(23)8-10-20(14,2)19(16)9-11-21(17,18)3/h12,16-19H,4-11H2,1-3H3/t16-,17+,18-,19-,20-,21+/m0/s1 Key: RJKFOVLPORLFTN-LEKSSAKUSA-N
- SMILES: CC(=O)[C@H]1CC[C@@H]2[C@@]1(CC[C@H]3[C@H]2CCC4=CC(=O)CC[C@]34C)C

Properties
Chemical formula	C_{21}H_{30}O_{2}
Molar mass	314.469 g/mol
Density	1.171
Melting point	126
log P	4.04

Pharmacology
ATC code	G03DA04 (WHO)
Routes of administration	By mouth, topical/transdermal, vaginal, intramuscular injection, subcutaneous injection, subcutaneous implant
- Pharmacokinetics
Bioavailability	OMP: <10%
Protein binding	• Albumin: 80% • CBG: 18% • SHBG: <1% • Free: 1–2%
Metabolism	Hepatic (CYP2C19, CYP3A4, CYP2C9, 5α-reductase, 3α-HSD, 17α-hydroxylase, 21-hydroxylase, 20α-HSD)
Biological half-life	OMP: 16–18 hours IM: 22–26 hours SC: 13–18 hours
Excretion	Renal
- Except where otherwise noted, data are given for materials in their standard state (at 25 °C [77 °F], 100 kPa). verify (what is ?) Infobox references

Progesterone (/proʊˈdʒɛstəroʊn/; P4) is an endogenous steroid and progestogen sex hormone involved in the menstrual cycle, pregnancy, and embryogenesis of humans and other species. It belongs to a group of steroid hormones called the progestogens and is the major progestogen in the body. Progesterone has a variety of important functions in the body. The hormone is also an important metabolic intermediate in the production of other endogenous steroids, including the sex hormones and the corticosteroids, and acts in the brain as a neurosteroid.

In addition to its role as a natural hormone, progesterone is also used as a medication, such as in combination with estrogen for contraception, to reduce the risk of uterine or cervical cancer, in hormone replacement therapy, and in feminizing hormone therapy. It was first prescribed in 1934.

== Biological activity ==
Progesterone is the most important progestogen in the body. As a potent agonist of the nuclear progesterone receptor (nPR) (with an affinity of K_{D} = 1 nM), the resulting effects on ribosomal transcription play a major role in regulation of female reproduction. In addition, progesterone is an agonist of the more recently discovered membrane progesterone receptors (mPRs), of which the expression has regulation effects in reproduction function (oocyte maturation, labor, and sperm motility) and cancer, although the roles are not yet well defined. Progesterone is also a ligand of the PGRMC1 (progesterone receptor membrane component 1) which impacts tumor progression, metabolic regulation, and viability control of nerve cells. Moreover, progesterone is also known to be an antagonist of the sigma σ_{1} receptor, a negative allosteric modulator of nicotinic acetylcholine receptors, and a potent antagonist of the mineralocorticoid receptor (MR). Progesterone prevents MR activation by binding to this receptor with an affinity exceeding even those of aldosterone, and glucocorticoids such as cortisol and corticosterone, and it produces antimineralocorticoid effects, such as natriuresis, at physiological concentrations. Progesterone also binds to, and behaves as a partial agonist of, the glucocorticoid receptor (GR), albeit with very low potency (EC_{50} >100-fold less relative to cortisol).

Through its neurosteroid active metabolites, such as 5α-dihydroprogesterone and allopregnanolone, progesterone acts indirectly as a positive allosteric modulator of the GABA_{A} receptor.

Progesterone and some of its metabolites, such as 5β-dihydroprogesterone, are agonists of the pregnane X receptor (PXR), albeit weakly so (EC_{50} >10 μM). In accordance, progesterone induces several hepatic cytochrome P450 enzymes, such as CYP3A4, especially during pregnancy when concentrations are much higher than usual. Perimenopausal women have been found to have greater CYP3A4 activity relative to men and postmenopausal women, and it has been inferred that this may be due to the higher progesterone levels present in perimenopausal women.

Progesterone modulates the activity of CatSper (cation channels of sperm) voltage-gated Ca^{2+} channels. Since eggs release progesterone, sperm may use progesterone as a homing signal to swim toward eggs (chemotaxis). As a result, it has been suggested that substances that block the progesterone binding site on CatSper channels could potentially be used in male contraception.

== Biological function ==
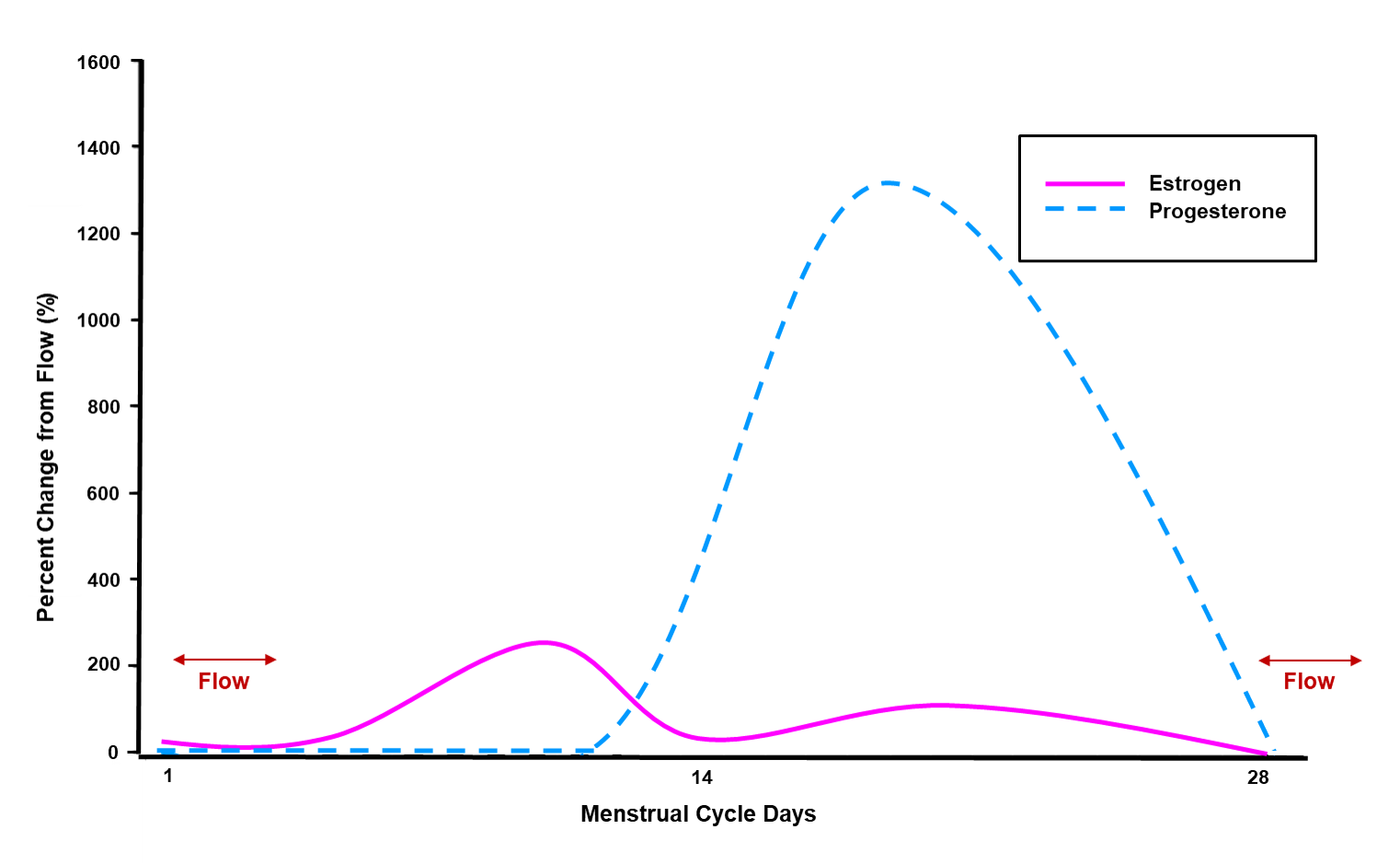
During the menstrual cycle, levels of estradiol (an estrogen) vary by 200 percent. Levels of progesterone vary by over 1200 percent.

=== Hormonal interactions ===
Progesterone has a number of physiological effects that are amplified in the presence of estrogens. Estrogens through estrogen receptors (ERs) induce or upregulate the expression of the PR. One example of this is in breast tissue, where estrogens allow progesterone to mediate lobuloalveolar development.

Elevated levels of progesterone potently reduce the sodium-retaining activity of aldosterone, resulting in natriuresis and a reduction in extracellular fluid volume. Progesterone withdrawal, on the other hand, is associated with a temporary increase in sodium retention (reduced natriuresis, with an increase in extracellular fluid volume) due to the compensatory increase in aldosterone production, which combats the blockade of the mineralocorticoid receptor by the previously elevated level of progesterone.

=== Early sexual differentiation ===
Placental progesterone can be converted into 5α-dihydrotestosterone (DHT), a potent androgen that is responsible for the development of male genitalia. This can be done both by conversion into testosterone, which is then converted to DHT, and via the androgen backdoor pathway, which is particularly important for fetal development. Progesterone is the precursor for both pathways and therefore contributes to sexual differentiation.

=== Reproductive system ===
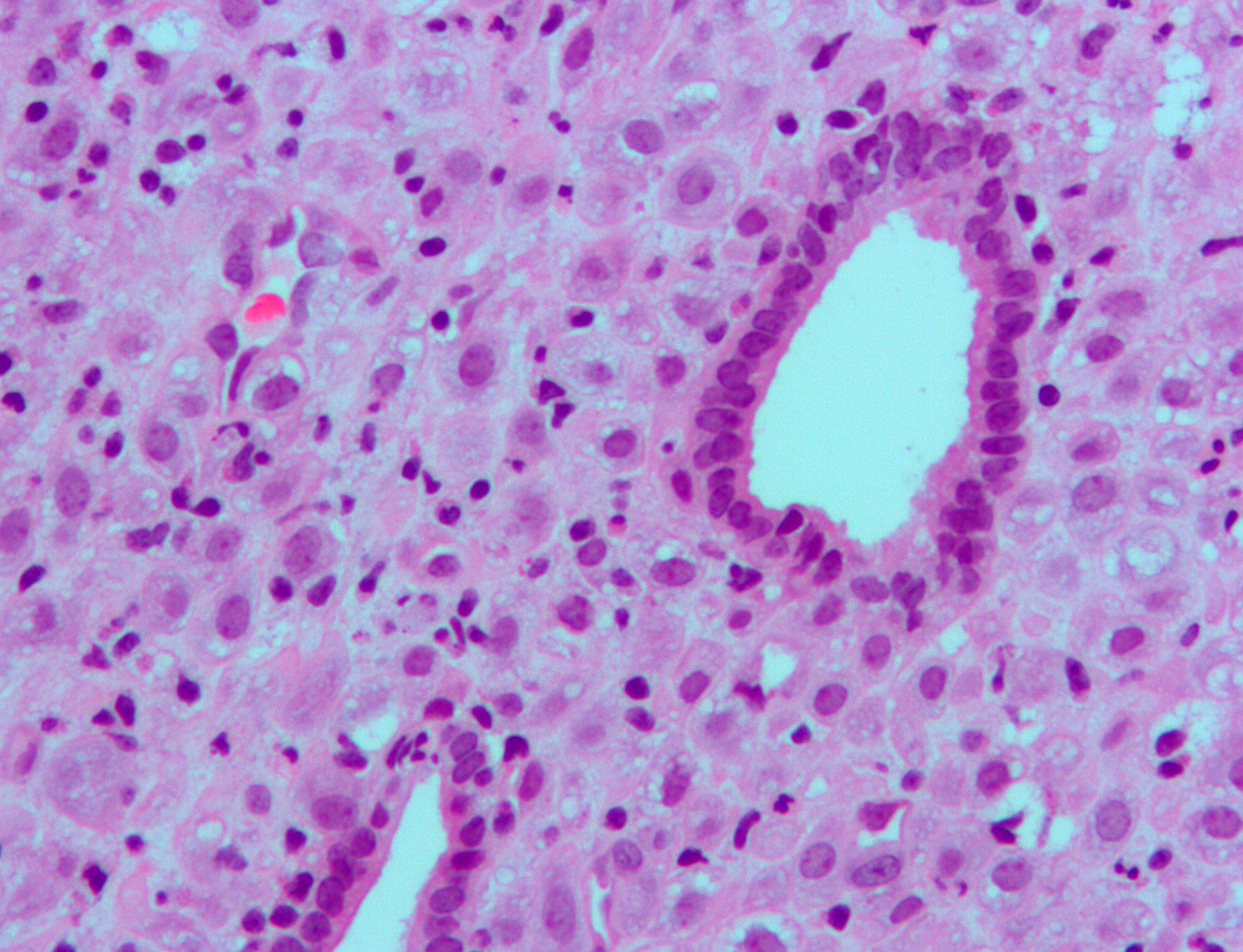
Micrograph showing changes to the endometrium due to progesterone (decidualization) H&E stain

Progesterone has key effects via non-genomic signalling on human sperm as they migrate through the female reproductive tract before fertilization occurs, though the receptor(s) as yet remain unidentified. Detailed characterization of the events occurring in sperm in response to progesterone has explained certain events including intracellular calcium transients and maintained changes, slow calcium oscillations, now thought to possibly regulate motility. It is produced by the ovaries. Progesterone has also been shown to demonstrate effects on octopus spermatozoa.

Progesterone is sometimes called the "hormone of pregnancy", and it has many roles relating to the development of the fetus:

- Progesterone converts the endometrium to its secretory stage to prepare the uterus for implantation. At the same time progesterone affects the vaginal epithelium and cervical mucus, making it thick and impenetrable to sperm. Progesterone is anti-mitogenic in endometrial epithelial cells, and as such, mitigates the tropic effects of estrogen. If pregnancy does not occur, progesterone levels will decrease, leading to menstruation. Normal menstrual bleeding is progesterone-withdrawal bleeding. If ovulation does not occur, and the corpus luteum does not develop, levels of progesterone may be low, leading to anovulatory dysfunctional uterine bleeding.
- During implantation and gestation, progesterone appears to decrease the maternal immune response to allow for the acceptance of the pregnancy.
- Progesterone decreases contractility of the uterine smooth muscle. This effect contributes to prevention of preterm labor. Studies have shown that in individuals who are pregnant with a single fetus, asymptomatic in the prenatal stage, and at a high risk of giving pre-term birth spontaneously, vaginal progesterone medication has been found to be effective in preventing spontaneous pre-term birth. Individuals who are at a high risk of giving pre-term birth spontaneously are those who have a short cervix of less than 25 mm or have previously given pre-term birth spontaneously. Although pre-term births are generally considered to be less than 37 weeks, these studies found that vaginal progesterone is associated with fewer pre-term births of less than 34 weeks.
- A drop in progesterone levels is possibly one step in the onset of labor.
- In addition, progesterone inhibits lactation during pregnancy. The fall in progesterone levels following delivery is one of the triggers for milk production.

The fetus metabolizes placental progesterone in the production of adrenal steroids.

=== Breasts ===
==== Lobuloalveolar development ====
Progesterone plays an important role in breast development. In conjunction with prolactin, it mediates lobuloalveolar maturation of the mammary glands during pregnancy to allow for milk production, and thus lactation and breastfeeding of offspring following parturition (childbirth). Estrogen induces expression of the progesterone receptors (PR) in breast tissue, and hence progesterone is dependent on estrogen to mediate lobuloalveolar development. It has been found that RANKL is a critical downstream mediator of progesterone-induced lobuloalveolar maturation. RANKL knockout mice show an almost identical mammary phenotype to PR knockout mice, including normal mammary ductal development, but complete failure of the development of lobuloalveolar structures.

==== Ductal development ====
Though to a far lesser extent than estrogen, which is the major mediator of mammary ductal development (via the ERα), progesterone may also be involved in ductal development of the mammary glands to some extent. PR knockout mice or mice treated with the PR antagonist mifepristone show delayed although otherwise normal mammary ductal development at puberty. In addition, mice modified to have overexpression of PRA display ductal hyperplasia, and progesterone induces ductal growth in the mouse mammary gland. Progesterone mediates ductal development mainly via induction of the expression of amphiregulin, the same growth factor that estrogen primarily induces the expression of to mediate ductal development. These animal findings suggest that, while not essential for full mammary ductal development, progesterone seems to play a potentiating or accelerating role in estrogen-mediated mammary ductal development.

==== Breast cancer risk ====
Progesterone also appears to be involved in the pathophysiology of breast cancer, though its role, and whether it is a promoter or inhibitor of breast cancer risk, has not been fully established. Most progestins, or synthetic progestogens, like medroxyprogesterone acetate, have been found to increase the risk of breast cancer in postmenopausal women in combination with estrogen as a component of menopausal hormone therapy. The combination of natural oral progesterone or the atypical progestin dydrogesterone with estrogen has been associated with less risk of breast cancer than progestins plus estrogen. However, this may simply be an artifact of the low progesterone levels produced with oral progesterone. The role of progesterone in breast cancer is not yet established.

=== Skin health ===
The estrogen receptor, as well as the progesterone receptor, have been detected in the skin, including in keratinocytes and fibroblasts. At menopause and thereafter, decreased levels of female sex hormones result in atrophy, thinning, and increased wrinkling of the skin, and a reduction in skin elasticity, firmness, and strength. These skin changes are an acceleration in skin aging and are the result of decreased collagen content, irregularities in the morphology of epidermal skin cells, decreased ground substance between skin fibers, and reduced capillaries and blood flow. The skin also becomes more dry during menopause, as a result of reduced skin hydration and surface lipids (sebum production). Along with chronological aging and photoaging, estrogen deficiency in menopause is one of the three main factors that predominantly influences skin aging.

Hormone replacement therapy, consisting of systemic treatment with estrogen alone or in combination with a progestogen, has well-documented and considerable beneficial effects on the skin of postmenopausal people. These benefits include increased skin collagen content, skin thickness and elasticity, and skin hydration and surface lipids. Topical estrogen has been found to have similar beneficial effects on the skin. In addition, a study has found that topical 2% progesterone cream significantly increases skin elasticity and firmness and observably decreases wrinkles in peri- and postmenopausal people. Skin hydration and surface lipids, on the other hand, did not significantly change with topical progesterone.

These findings suggest that progesterone, like estrogen, also has beneficial effects on the skin and may be independently protective against skin aging.

=== Sexuality ===
==== Libido ====
Progesterone and its neurosteroid active metabolite, allopregnanolone, appear to be importantly involved in libido in females.

==== Homosexuality ====
Dr. Diana Fleischman, of the University of Portsmouth, and colleagues looked for a relationship between progesterone and sexual attitudes in 92 women. Their research, published in the Archives of Sexual Behavior found that women who had higher levels of progesterone scored higher on a questionnaire measuring homoerotic motivation. They also found that men who had high levels of progesterone were more likely to have higher homoerotic motivation scores after affiliative priming compared to men with low levels of progesterone.

=== Nervous system ===
Progesterone, like pregnenolone and dehydroepiandrosterone (DHEA), belongs to an important group of endogenous steroids called neurosteroids. The steroid can be metabolized within all parts of the central nervous system.

Neurosteroids are neuromodulators and are neuroprotective, neurogenic, and regulate neurotransmission and myelination. The effects of progesterone as a neurosteroid are mediated predominantly through its interactions with non-nuclear PRs, namely the mPRs and PGRMC1, as well as certain other receptors, such as the σ_{1} and nACh receptors.

=== Brain damage ===
Previous studies have shown that progesterone supports the normal development of neurons in the brain, and that the hormone has a protective effect on damaged brain tissue. Animal models show that females have reduced susceptibility to traumatic brain injury, and this protective effect has been hypothesized to be caused by increased circulating levels of estrogen and progesterone in females.

==== Proposed mechanism ====
The mechanism of progesterone protective effects may be the reduction of inflammation that follows brain trauma and hemorrhage.

Damage incurred by traumatic brain injury is believed to be caused in part by mass depolarization leading to excitotoxicity. One way in which progesterone helps to alleviate some of this excitotoxicity is by blocking the voltage-dependent calcium channels that trigger neurotransmitter release. It does so by manipulating the signaling pathways of transcription factors involved in this release. Another method for reducing the excitotoxicity is by up-regulating the GABA_{A}, a widespread inhibitory neurotransmitter receptor.

Progesterone has also been shown to prevent apoptosis in neurons, a common consequence of brain injury. The hormone does so by inhibiting enzymes involved in the apoptosis pathway specifically concerning the mitochondria, such as activated caspase-3 and cytochrome c.

Not only does progesterone help prevent further damage, it has also been shown to aid in neuroregeneration. One of the serious effects of traumatic brain injury includes edema. Animal studies show that progesterone treatment leads to a decrease in edema levels by increasing the concentration of macrophages and microglia sent to the injured tissue. This was observed in the form of reduced leakage from the blood brain barrier in secondary recovery in progesterone treated rats. In addition, progesterone was observed to have antioxidant properties, reducing the concentration of oxygen free radicals faster than without. There is also evidence that the addition of progesterone can also help remyelinate damaged axons due to trauma, restoring some lost neural signal conduction. Another way progesterone aids in regeneration includes increasing the circulation of endothelial progenitor cells in the brain. This aids the growth of new vasculature around scar tissue, helping to repair the area of insult.

=== Addiction ===
Progesterone enhances the function of serotonin receptors in the brain, so an excess or deficit of progesterone has the potential to result in significant neurochemical issues. This link explains why some people resort to substances that enhance serotonin activity such as nicotine, alcohol, and cannabis when their progesterone levels fall below optimal levels.

- Sex differences in hormone levels may induce women to respond differently than men to nicotine. When women undergo cyclic changes or different hormonal transition phases (menopause, pregnancy, adolescence), there are changes in their progesterone levels. Therefore, females have an increased biological vulnerability to nicotine's reinforcing effects compared to males, and progesterone may be used to counter this enhanced vulnerability. This information supports the idea that progesterone can affect behavior.
- Similar to nicotine, cocaine also increases the release of dopamine in the brain. Dopamine is one of the main neurotransmitters involved with addiction in dopaminergic drugs. In a study of rhesus monkeys that were administered cocaine, and then given the opportunity to self-administer the drug, progesterone was reported to cause a reduction in self-administration, while investigative markers were proposed to indicate a reduction in subjective positive experience. Thus, progesterone was suggested as an agent that decreases cocaine craving by reducing the dopaminergic properties of the drug.

=== Societal ===
In a 2012 University of Amsterdam study of 120 women, the women's luteal phase (higher levels of progesterone, and increasing levels of estrogen) was correlated with a lower level of competitive behavior in gambling and math contest scenarios, while their premenstrual phase (sharply decreasing levels of progesterone, and decreasing levels of estrogen) was correlated with a higher level of competitive behavior.

=== Other effects ===
- Progesterone also has a role in skin elasticity and bone strength, in respiration, in nerve tissue and in female sexuality, and the presence of progesterone receptors in certain muscle and fat tissue may hint at a role in sexually dimorphic proportions of those.
- During pregnancy, progesterone is said to decrease uterine irritability.
- During pregnancy, progesterone helps to suppress immune responses of the mother to fetal antigens, thus preventing rejection of the fetus.
- Progesterone raises epidermal growth factor-1 (EGF-1) levels, a factor often used to induce proliferation of stem cells, and used to sustain stem cell cultures.
- Progesterone increases core temperature (thermogenic function) during ovulation.
- Progesterone reduces spasm and relaxes smooth muscle. Bronchi are widened and mucus regulated. (PRs are widely present in submucosal tissue.)
- Progesterone acts as an anti-inflammatory agent and regulates the immune response.
- Progesterone reduces gallbladder activity.
- Progesterone normalizes blood clotting and vascular tone, zinc and copper levels, cell oxygen levels, and use of fat stores for energy.
- Progesterone may affect gum health, increasing risk of gingivitis (gum inflammation).
- Progesterone appears to prevent endometrial cancer (involving the uterine lining) by regulating the effects of estrogen.
- Progesterone plays an important role in the signaling of insulin release and pancreatic function, and it may affect the susceptibility to diabetes or gestational diabetes.
- Progesterone levels in the blood were found to be lower in those who had higher weight and higher BMI among those who became pregnant through in vitro fertilization.
- Current data shows that micronized progesterone, which is chemically identical to the progesterone produced in the human body, in combination with estrogen in menopausal hormone therapy does not seem to have significant effects on venous thromboembolism (blood clots in veins) and ischemic stroke (lack of blood flow to the brain due to blockage of a blood vessel that supplies the brain). However, more studies need to be conducted to see whether or not micronized progesterone alone or in combined menopausal hormone therapy changes the risk of myocardial infarctions (heart attacks).
- There have not been any studies done yet on the effects of micronized progesterone on hair loss due to menopause.
- Despite suggestions for using hormone therapy to prevent loss of muscle mass in post-menopausal individuals (age 50+), menopausal hormone therapy involving either estrogen alone, or estrogen and progesterone combined, has not been found to preserve muscle mass. Menopausal hormone therapy also does not result in body weight reduction, BMI reduction, or change in glucose metabolism.

== Biochemistry ==
=== Biosynthesis ===
Steroidogenesis, showing progesterone among the progestogens (yellow area)

In mammals, progesterone, like all other steroid hormones, is synthesized from pregnenolone, which itself is derived from cholesterol.

Cholesterol undergoes double oxidation to produce 22R-hydroxycholesterol and then 20α,22R-dihydroxycholesterol. This vicinal diol is then further oxidized with loss of the side chain starting at position C22 to produce pregnenolone. This reaction is catalyzed by cytochrome P450scc.

The conversion of pregnenolone to progesterone takes place in two steps. First, the 3β-hydroxyl group is oxidized to a keto group and second, the double bond is moved to C4, from C5 through a keto/enol tautomerization reaction. This reaction is catalyzed by 3β-hydroxysteroid dehydrogenase/δ^{5-4}-isomerase.

Progesterone in turn is the precursor of the mineralocorticoid aldosterone, and after conversion to 17α-hydroxyprogesterone, of cortisol and androstenedione. Androstenedione can be converted to testosterone, estrone, and estradiol, highlighting the critical role of progesterone in testosterone synthesis.

Pregnenolone and progesterone can also be synthesized by yeast.

Approximately 30 mg of progesterone is secreted from the ovaries per day in reproductive-age women, while the adrenal glands produce about 1 mg of progesterone per day.

Production rates, secretion rates, clearance rates, and blood levels of major sex hormones
Sex	Sex hormone	Reproductive phase	Blood production rate	Gonadal secretion rate	Metabolic clearance rate	Reference range (serum levels)	
Sex	Sex hormone	Reproductive phase	Blood production rate	Gonadal secretion rate	Metabolic clearance rate	Molar concentration	Mass concentration
Men	Androstenedione	–	2.8 mg/day	1.6 mg/day	2200 L/day	2.8–7.3 nmol/L	80–210 ng/dL
Men	Testosterone	–	6.5 mg/day	6.2 mg/day	950 L/day	6.9–34.7 nmol/L	200–1000 ng/dL
Men	Estrone	–	150 μg/day	110 μg/day	2050 L/day	37–250 pmol/L	10–70 pg/mL
Men	Estradiol	–	60 μg/day	50 μg/day	1600 L/day	<37–210 pmol/L	10–57 pg/mL
Men	Estrone sulfate	–	80 μg/day	Insignificant	167 L/day	600–2500 pmol/L	200–900 pg/mL
Women	Androstenedione	–	3.2 mg/day	2.8 mg/day	2000 L/day	3.1–12.2 nmol/L	89–350 ng/dL
Women	Testosterone	–	190 μg/day	60 μg/day	500 L/day	0.7–2.8 nmol/L	20–81 ng/dL
Women	Estrone	Follicular phase	110 μg/day	80 μg/day	2200 L/day	110–400 pmol/L	30–110 pg/mL
Women	Estrone	Luteal phase	260 μg/day	150 μg/day	2200 L/day	310–660 pmol/L	80–180 pg/mL
Women	Estrone	Postmenopause	40 μg/day	Insignificant	1610 L/day	22–230 pmol/L	6–60 pg/mL
Women	Estradiol	Follicular phase	90 μg/day	80 μg/day	1200 L/day	<37–360 pmol/L	10–98 pg/mL
Women	Estradiol	Luteal phase	250 μg/day	240 μg/day	1200 L/day	699–1250 pmol/L	190–341 pg/mL
Women	Estradiol	Postmenopause	6 μg/day	Insignificant	910 L/day	<37–140 pmol/L	10–38 pg/mL
Women	Estrone sulfate	Follicular phase	100 μg/day	Insignificant	146 L/day	700–3600 pmol/L	250–1300 pg/mL
Women	Estrone sulfate	Luteal phase	180 μg/day	Insignificant	146 L/day	1100–7300 pmol/L	400–2600 pg/mL
Women	Progesterone	Follicular phase	2 mg/day	1.7 mg/day	2100 L/day	0.3–3 nmol/L	0.1–0.9 ng/mL
Women	Progesterone	Luteal phase	25 mg/day	24 mg/day	2100 L/day	19–45 nmol/L	6–14 ng/mL
Notes and sources Notes: "The concentration of a steroid in the circulation is determined by the rate at which it is secreted from glands, the rate of metabolism of precursor or prehormones into the steroid, and the rate at which it is extracted by tissues and metabolized. The secretion rate of a steroid refers to the total secretion of the compound from a gland per unit time. Secretion rates have been assessed by sampling the venous effluent from a gland over time and subtracting out the arterial and peripheral venous hormone concentration. The metabolic clearance rate of a steroid is defined as the volume of blood that has been completely cleared of the hormone per unit time. The production rate of a steroid hormone refers to entry into the blood of the compound from all possible sources, including secretion from glands and conversion of prohormones into the steroid of interest. At steady state, the amount of hormone entering the blood from all sources will be equal to the rate at which it is being cleared (metabolic clearance rate) multiplied by blood concentration (production rate = metabolic clearance rate × concentration). If there is little contribution of prohormone metabolism to the circulating pool of steroid, then the production rate will approximate the secretion rate." Sources: See template.

=== Distribution ===
Progesterone binds extensively to plasma proteins, including albumin (50‍–‍54%) and transcortin (43‍–‍48%). It has similar affinity for albumin relative to the PR.

=== Metabolism ===
The metabolism of progesterone is rapid and extensive, and it occurs mainly in the liver, though enzymes that metabolize progesterone are also expressed widely in the brain, skin, and various other extrahepatic tissues. Progesterone has an elimination half-life of only approximately five minutes in circulation. The metabolism of progesterone is complex, and it may form as many as 35 different unconjugated metabolites when it is ingested orally. Progesterone is highly susceptible to enzymatic reduction via reductases and hydroxysteroid dehydrogenases because of its double bond (between the C4 and C5 positions) and its two ketones (at the C3 and C20 positions).

The major metabolic pathway of progesterone is reduction by 5α-reductase and 5β-reductase, into the dihydrogenated 5α-dihydroprogesterone and 5β-dihydroprogesterone, respectively. This is followed by the further reduction of these metabolites via 3α-hydroxysteroid dehydrogenase and 3β-hydroxysteroid dehydrogenase into the tetrahydrogenated allopregnanolone, pregnanolone, isopregnanolone, and epipregnanolone. Subsequently, 20α-hydroxysteroid dehydrogenase and 20β-hydroxysteroid dehydrogenase reduce these metabolites to form the corresponding hexahydrogenated pregnanediols (eight different isomers in total), which are then conjugated via glucuronidation and/or sulfation, released from the liver into circulation, and excreted by the kidneys into the urine. The major metabolite of progesterone in the urine is the 3α,5β,20α isomer of pregnanediol glucuronide, which has been found to constitute 15‍–‍30% of an injection of progesterone. Other metabolites of progesterone formed by the enzymes in this pathway include 3α-dihydroprogesterone, 3β-dihydroprogesterone, 20α-dihydroprogesterone, and 20β-dihydroprogesterone, as well as various combination products of the enzymes aside from those already mentioned. Progesterone can also first be hydroxylated (see below) and then reduced. Endogenous progesterone is metabolized approximately 50% into 5α-dihydroprogesterone in the corpus luteum, 35% into 3β-dihydroprogesterone in the liver, and 10% into 20α-dihydroprogesterone.

Relatively small portions of progesterone are hydroxylated via 17α-hydroxylase (CYP17A1) and 21-hydroxylase (CYP21A2), into 17α-hydroxyprogesterone and 11-deoxycorticosterone (21-hydroxyprogesterone), respectively, and pregnanetriols are formed secondarily to 17α-hydroxylation. Even smaller amounts of progesterone may also be hydroxylated via 11β-hydroxylase (CYP11B1) and, to a lesser extent, via aldosterone synthase (CYP11B2) into 11β-hydroxyprogesterone. In addition, progesterone can be hydroxylated in the liver by other cytochrome P450 enzymes that are not steroid-specific. Catalyzed mainly by CYP3A4, 6β-Hydroxylation is the major transformation and is responsible for approximately 70% of cytochrome P450-mediated progesterone metabolism. Other routes include 6α-, 16α-, and 16β-hydroxylation. However, treatment of women with ketoconazole (a strong CYP3A4 inhibitor) had minimal effects on progesterone levels, producing only a slight and non-significant increase, suggesting that cytochrome P450 enzymes play only a small role in progesterone metabolism.

Metabolism of progesterone in humans
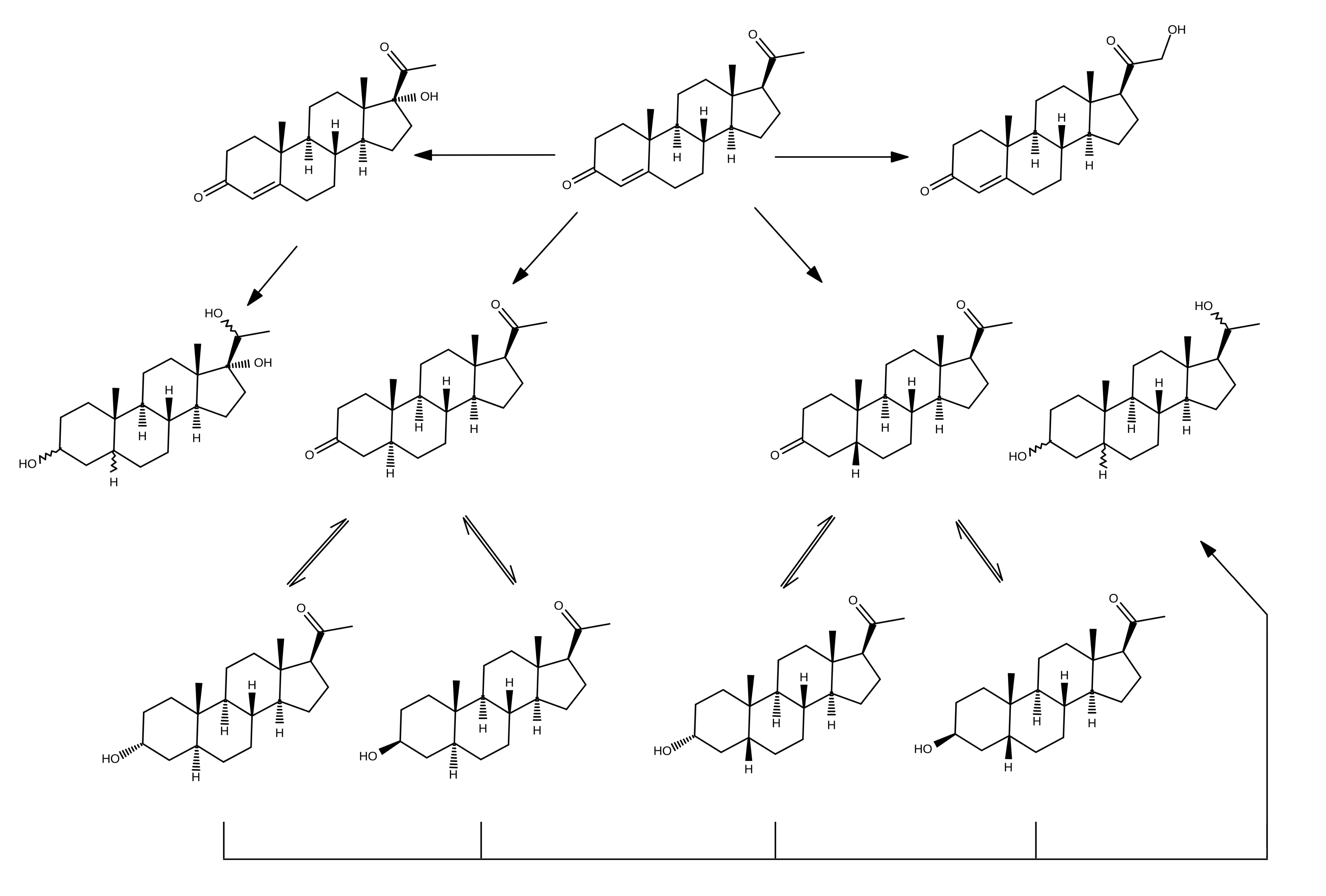
This diagram illustrates the metabolic pathways involved in the metabolism of progesterone in humans. In addition to the transformations shown in the diagram, conjugation (specifically glucuronidation and sulfation) occurs with metabolites of progesterone that have one or more available hydroxyl (–OH) groups.

=== Levels ===
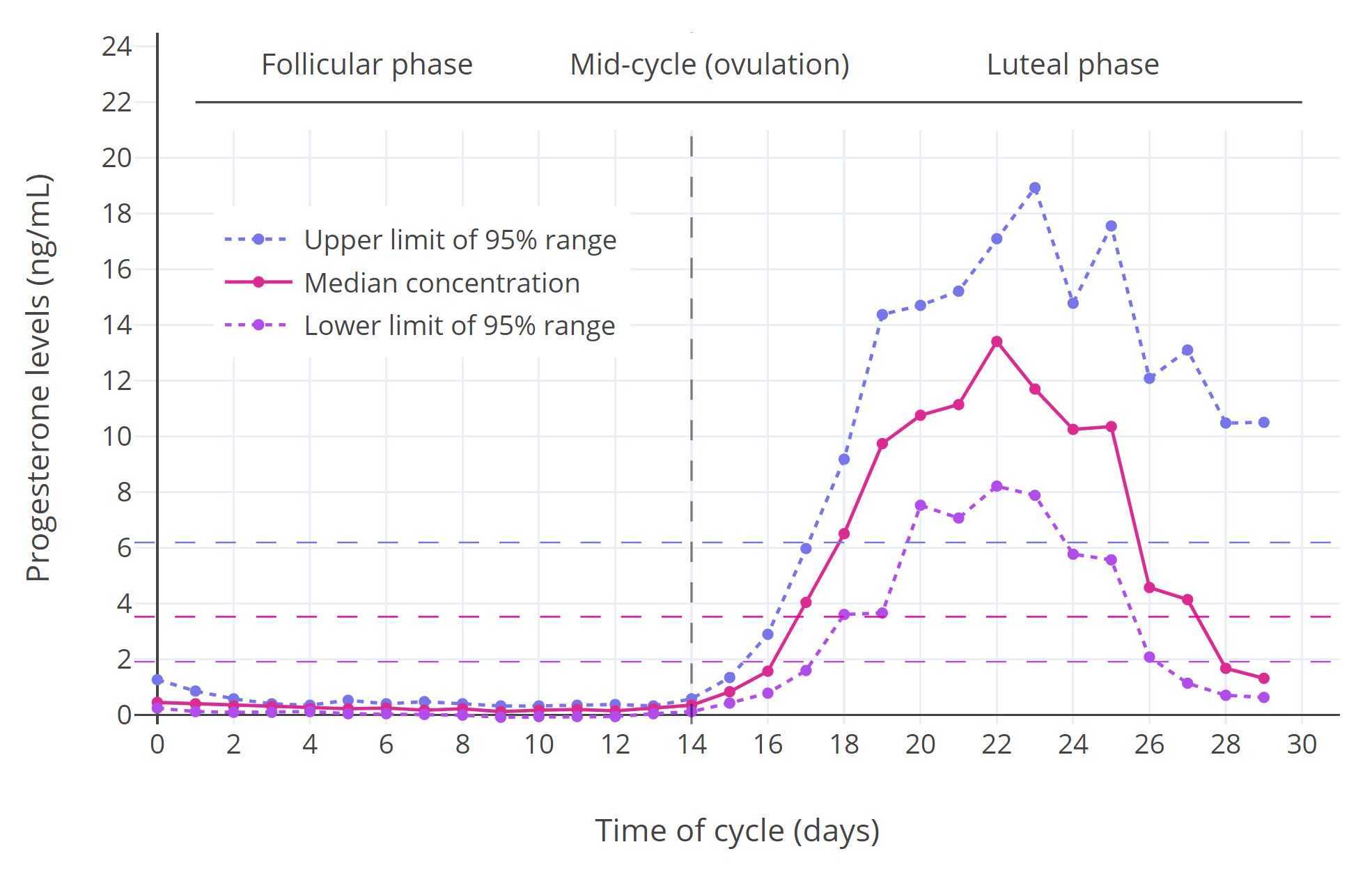
Progesterone levels across the menstrual cycle in normally cycling and ovulatory women. The horizontal lines are the mean integrated levels for each curve; the vertical line is mid-cycle.

Relatively low during the preovulatory phase of the menstrual cycle, progesterone levels rise after ovulation and are elevated during the luteal phase, as shown in the diagram. Progesterone levels tend to be less than 2 ng/mL prior to ovulation and greater than 5 ng/mL after ovulation. If pregnancy occurs, human chorionic gonadotropin is released, maintaining the corpus luteum and allowing it to maintain levels of progesterone. Between seven and nine weeks gestation, the placenta begins to produce progesterone in place of the corpus luteum in a process called the luteal-placental shift.

After the luteal-placental shift, progesterone levels start to rise further and may reach 100 to 200 ng/mL at term. Whether a decrease in progesterone levels is critical for the initiation of labor has been argued and may be species-specific. After delivery of the placenta and during lactation, progesterone levels are very low.

Progesterone levels are low in children and postmenopausal people. Adult males have levels similar to those in women during the follicular phase of the menstrual cycle.

Endogenous progesterone production rates and plasma progesterone levels
Group	P4 production	P4 levels
Prepubertal children	ND	0.06–0.5 ng/mL
Pubertal girls Tanner stage I (childhood); Tanner stage II (ages 8–12); Tanner stage III (ages 10–13); Tanner stage IV (ages 11–14); Tanner stage V (ages 12–15); Follicular phase (days 1–14); Luteal phase (days 15–28)	ND; ND; ND; ND ND; ND	0.22 (<0.10–0.32) ng/mL; 0.30 (0.10–0.51) ng/mL; 0.36 (0.10–0.75) ng/mL; 1.75 (<0.10–25.0) ng/mL 0.35 (0.13–0.75) ng/mL; 2.0–25.0 ng/mL
Premenopausal women Follicular phase (days 1–14); Luteal phase (days 15–28); Oral contraceptive (anovulatory)	0.75–5.4 mg/day 15–50 mg/day ND	0.02–1.2 ng/mL; 4–30 ng/mL; 0.1–0.3 ng/mL
Postmenopausal women Oophorectomized women Oophorectomized and adrenalectomized women	ND; 1.2 mg/day <0.3 mg/day	0.03–0.3 ng/mL; 0.39 ng/mL; ND
Pregnant women First trimester (weeks 1–12); Second trimester (weeks 13–26); Third trimester (weeks 27–40); Postpartum (at 24 hours)	55 mg/day 92–100 mg/day 190–563 mg/day ND	9–75 ng/mL; 17–146 ng/mL; 55–255 ng/mL; 19 ng/mL
Men	0.75–3 mg/day	0.1–0.3 ng/mL
Notes: Mean levels are given as a single value and ranges are given after in parentheses. Sources:

==== Ranges ====
Blood test results should always be interpreted using the reference ranges provided by the laboratory that performed the results. Example reference ranges are listed below.

Person type	Reference range for blood test		
Person type	Lower limit	Upper limit	Unit
Female - menstrual cycle	(see diagram below)		
Female - postmenopausal	<0.2	1	ng/mL
Female - postmenopausal	<0.6	3	nmol/L
Female on oral contraceptives	0.34	0.92	ng/mL
Female on oral contraceptives	1.1	2.9	nmol/L
Males ≥16 years	0.27	0.9	ng/mL
Males ≥16 years	0.86	2.9	nmol/L
Female or male 1–9 years	0.1	4.1 or 4.5	ng/mL
Female or male 1–9 years	0.3	13	nmol/L

Reference ranges for the blood content of progesterone during the menstrual cycle

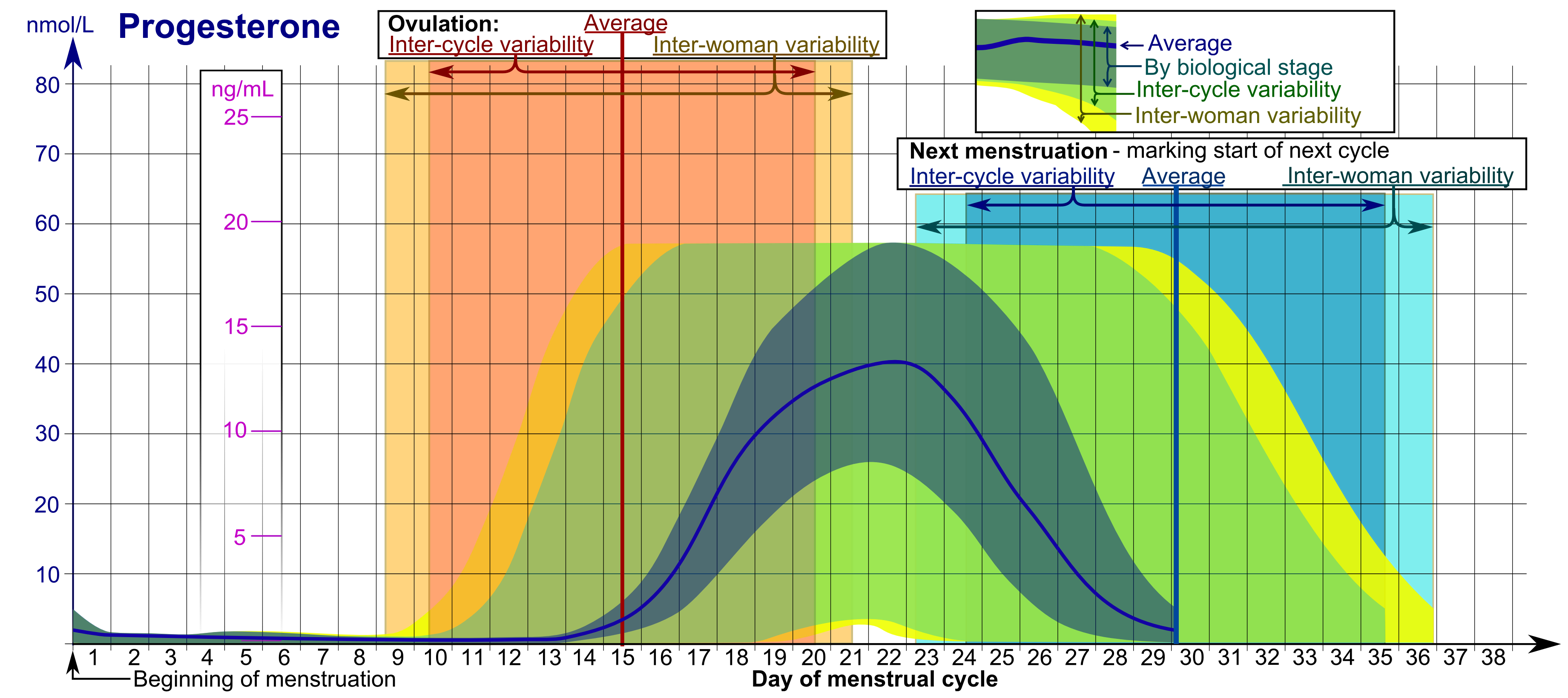
Progesterone levels during the menstrual cycle • The ranges denoted By biological stage may be used in closely monitored menstrual cycles relative to other markers of its biological progression, with the time scale being compressed or stretched to how much faster or slower, respectively, the cycle progresses compared to an average cycle. • The ranges denoted Inter-cycle variability are more appropriate to use in non-monitored cycles with only the beginning of menstruation known, but where the woman accurately knows her average cycle lengths and time of ovulation, and that they are somewhat averagely regular, with the time scale being compressed or stretched to how much a woman's average cycle length is shorter or longer, respectively, than the average of the population. • The ranges denoted Inter-woman variability are more appropriate to use when the average cycle lengths and time of ovulation are unknown, but only the beginning of menstruation is given.

=== Sources ===
==== Animal ====
Progesterone is produced in high amounts in the ovaries (by the corpus luteum) from the onset of puberty to menopause. The hormone is produced in smaller amounts by the adrenal glands after the onset of adrenarche in both males and females. To a lesser extent, progesterone is produced in nervous tissue, especially in the brain, and also in adipose tissue (fat).

During human pregnancy, progesterone is produced in increasingly high amounts by the ovaries and placenta. At first, the source is the corpus luteum that has been "rescued" by the presence of human chorionic gonadotropin (hCG) from the conceptus. However, after the eighth week, production of progesterone shifts to the placenta which uses maternal cholesterol as the initial substrate, and most of the produced progesterone enters the maternal circulation, but some is picked up by the fetal circulation and used as substrate for fetal corticosteroids. At term, the placenta produces about 250 mg progesterone per day.

An additional animal source of progesterone is milk products. After consumption of milk products the level of bioavailable progesterone goes up.

==== Plants ====
Progesterone has been positively identified in the plant Juglans regia, a species of walnut. In addition, progesterone-like steroids are found in the plant Dioscorea mexicana, part of the yam family native to Mexico. Dioscorea mexicana contains a steroid called diosgenin which is taken from the plant and converted into progesterone. Diosgenin and progesterone are also found in other Dioscorea species, as well as in other plants that are not closely related, such as fenugreek.

Another plant that contains substances readily convertible to progesterone is Dioscorea pseudojaponica, native to Taiwan. Research has shown that the Taiwanese yam contains saponins—steroids that can be converted to diosgenin and thence to progesterone.

Many other Dioscorea species of the yam family contain steroidal substances from which progesterone can be produced. Among the more notable of these are Dioscorea villosa and Dioscorea polygonoides. One study showed that the Dioscorea villosa contains 3.5% diosgenin. Dioscorea polygonoides has been found to contain 2.64% diosgenin, as shown by gas chromatography-mass spectrometry. Many of the Dioscorea species that originate from the yam family grow in countries with tropical and subtropical climates.

== Medical use ==
Progesterone is used as a medication. The hormone is used in combination with estrogens mainly in hormone therapy for menopausal symptoms and low sex hormone levels. It may also be used alone to treat menopausal symptoms. Studies have shown that transdermal progesterone (skin patch) and oral micronized progesterone are effective treatments for certain symptoms of menopause such as hot flashes and night sweats, otherwise referred to as vasomotor symptoms or VMS.

Progesterone is also used to support pregnancy and fertility and to treat gynecological disorders. Progesterone has been shown to prevent miscarriage in those with vaginal bleeding early in their current pregnancy and having a previous history of miscarriage. Progesterone can be taken by mouth, through the vagina, and by injection into muscle or fat, among other routes.

== Chemistry ==
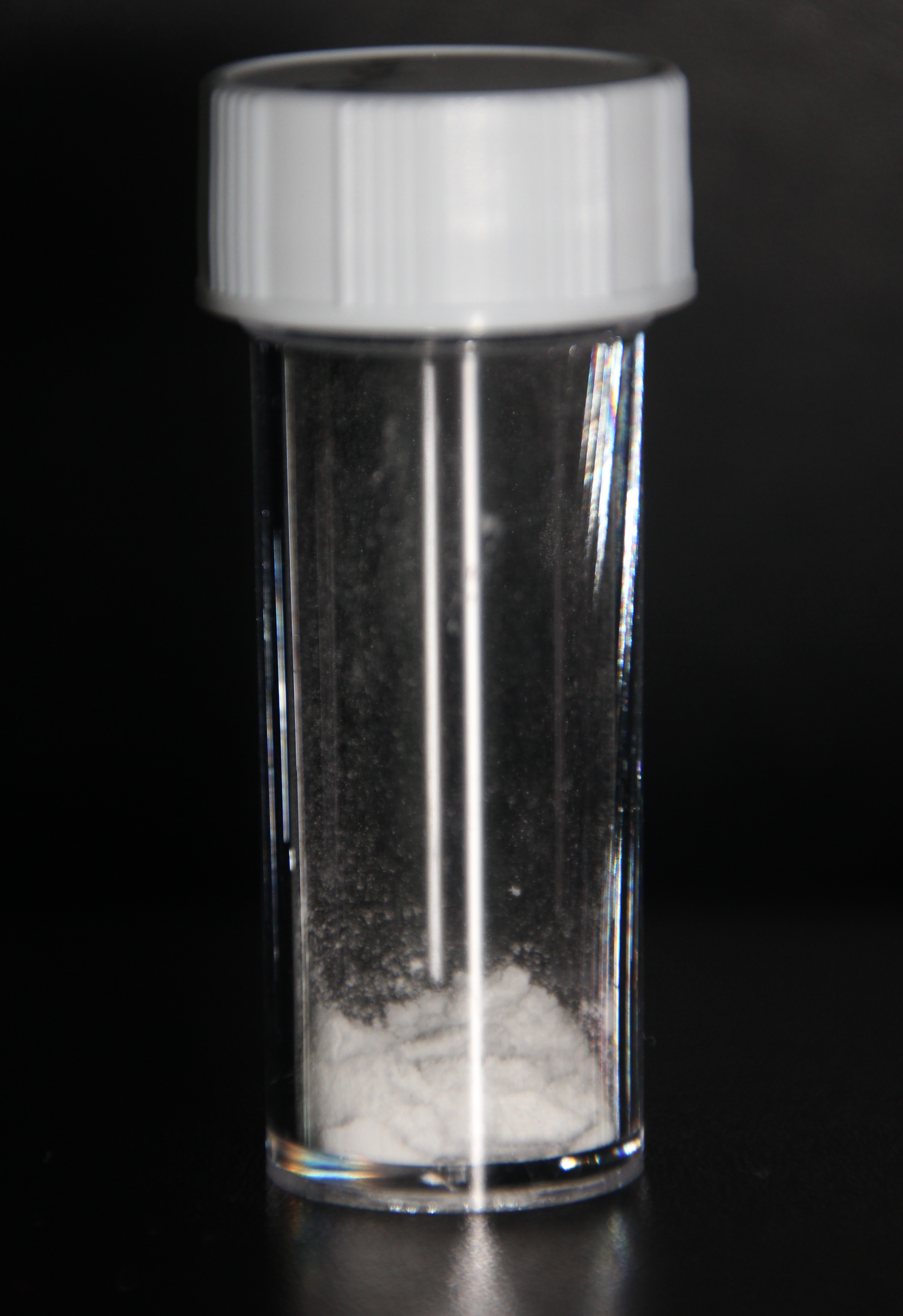
A sample of progesterone

Progesterone is a naturally occurring pregnane steroid and is also known as pregn-4-ene-3,20-dione. It has a double bond (4-ene) between the C4 and C5 positions, and two ketone groups (3,20-dione), one at the C3 position and the other at the C20 position.

=== Synthesis ===
Progesterone is commercially produced by semisynthesis. Two main routes are used: one from yam diosgenin first pioneered by Marker in 1940, and one based on soy phytosterols scaled up in the 1970s. Additional (not necessarily economical) semisyntheses of progesterone have also been reported starting from a variety of steroids. For the example, cortisone can be simultaneously deoxygenated at the C-17 and C-21 position by treatment with iodotrimethylsilane in chloroform to produce 11-keto-progesterone (ketogestin), which in turn can be reduced at position-11 to yield progesterone.

==== Marker semisynthesis ====
An economical semisynthesis of progesterone from the plant steroid diosgenin isolated from yams was developed by Russell Marker in 1940 for the Parke-Davis pharmaceutical company. This synthesis is known as the Marker degradation.

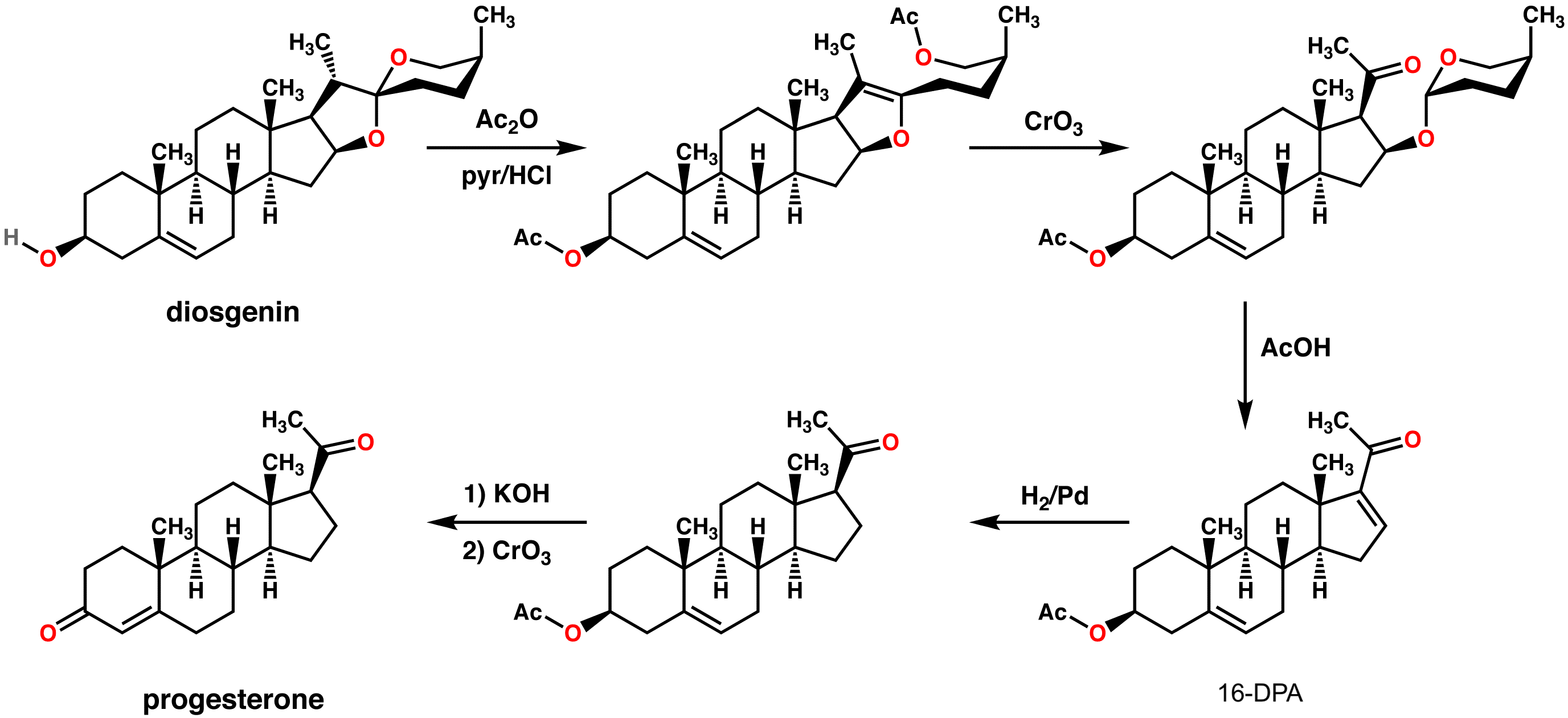
The Marker semisynthesis of progesterone from diosgenin

The 16-DPA intermediate is important to the synthesis of many other medically important steroids. A similar approach can produce 16-DPA from solanine.

==== Soy semisynthesis ====
Progesterone can also be made from the stigmasterol found in soybean oil also. c.f. Percy Julian.

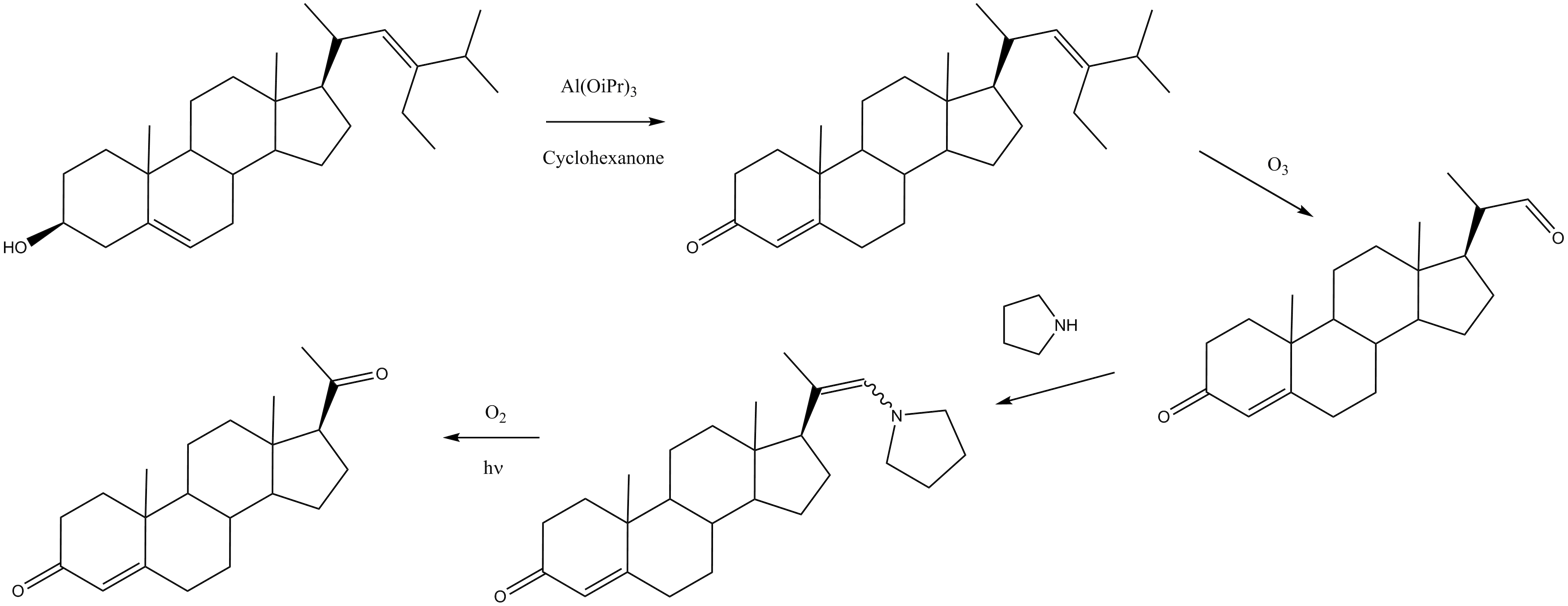
Stigmasterol to progesterone synthesis

==== Total synthesis ====
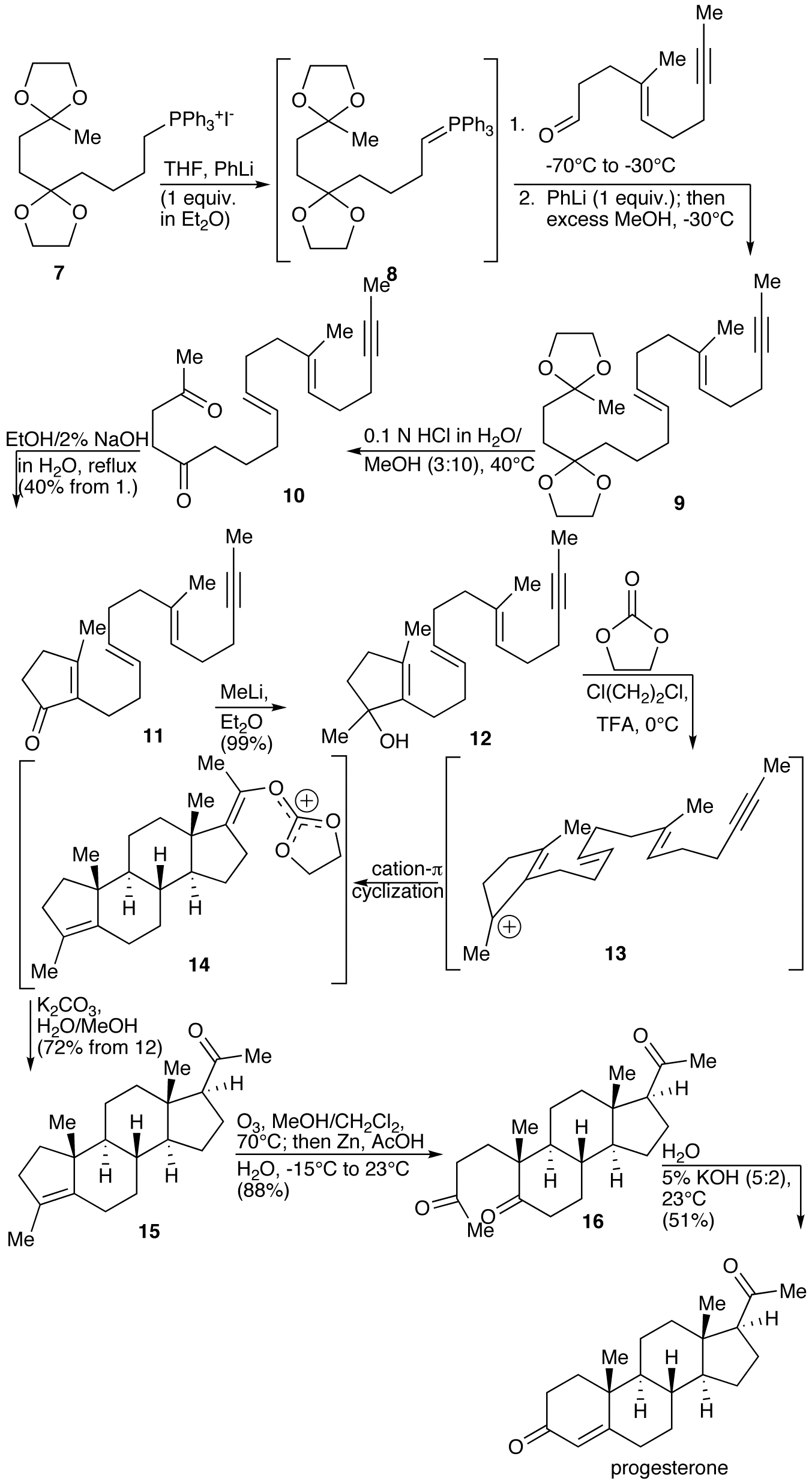
The Johnson total synthesis of progesterone

A total synthesis of progesterone was reported in 1971 by William S. Johnson. The synthesis begins with reacting the phosphonium salt 7 with phenyl lithium to produce the phosphonium ylide 8. The ylide 8 is reacted with an aldehyde to produce the alkene 9. The ketal protecting groups of 9 are hydrolyzed to produce the diketone 10, which in turn is cyclized to form the cyclopentenone 11. The ketone of 11 is reacted with methyl lithium to yield the tertiary alcohol 12, which in turn is treated with acid to produce the tertiary cation 13. The key step of the synthesis is the π-cation cyclization of 13 in which the B-, C-, and D-rings of the steroid are simultaneously formed to produce 14. This step resembles the cationic cyclization reaction used in the biosynthesis of steroids and hence is referred to as biomimetic. In the next step the enol orthoester is hydrolyzed to produce the ketone 15. The cyclopentene A-ring is then opened by oxidizing with ozone to produce 16. Finally, the diketone 17 undergoes an intramolecular aldol condensation by treating with aqueous potassium hydroxide to produce progesterone.

== History ==
George W. Corner and Willard M. Allen discovered the hormonal action of progesterone in 1929. By 1931–1932, nearly pure crystalline material of high progestational activity had been isolated from the corpus luteum of animals; by 1934, pure crystalline progesterone had been refined and obtained, and the chemical structure of progesterone was determined. This was achieved by Adolf Butenandt at the Chemisches Institut of Gdańsk Technical University in Danzig, who extracted this new compound from several thousand liters of urine.

Chemical synthesis of progesterone from stigmasterol and pregnanediol was accomplished later that year. Up to this point, progesterone, known generically as corpus luteum hormone, had been being referred to by several groups by different names, including corporin, lutein, luteosterone, and progestin. In 1935, at the time of the Second International Conference on the Standardization of Sex Hormones in London, England, a compromise was reached between the groups, and the name 'progesterone' (progestational steroidal ketone) was created.

=== Veterinary use ===
The use of progesterone tests in dog breeding to pinpoint ovulation is becoming more widely used. There are several tests available, the most reliable being a blood test with the blood sample drawn by a veterinarian and sent to a lab for processing. Results can usually be obtained within 24 to 72 hours. The rationale for using progesterone tests is that increased numbers begin close to the preovulatory surge in gonadotrophins and continue through ovulation and estrus. When progesterone levels reach certain levels they can signal the stage of estrus the female is. Prediction of birth date of the pending litter can be accurate if ovulation date is known. Puppies deliver within a day or two of nine weeks gestation in most cases. Determining pregnancy using progesterone tests once a breeding has taken place is not possible, however. This limitation is due to the fact that, in dogs, progesterone levels remain elevated throughout the estrus period.

=== Pricing ===
Pricing for progesterone can vary depending location, insurance coverage, discount coupons, quantity, shortages, manufacturers, brand or generic versions, different pharmacies, and so on. As of 2023, 30 capsules of 100 mg of the generic version, Progesterone, from CVS Pharmacy is around $40 without any discounts or insurance applied. The brand version, Prometrium, is around $450 for 30 capsules without any discounts or insurance applied. In comparison, Walgreens offers 30 capsules of 100 mg in the generic version for $51 without insurance or coupons applied. The brand name costs around $431 for 30 capsules of 100 mg.
