= Epipregnanolone =

Names
- IUPAC name 3β-Hydroxy-5β-pregnan-20-one
- Systematic IUPAC name 1-[(1S,3aS,3bR,5aR,7S,9aS,9bS,11aS)-7-Hydroxy-9a,11a-dimethylhexadecahydro-1H-cyclopenta[a]phenanthren-1-yl]ethan-1-one
- Other names 3β,5β-Tetrahydroprogesterone

Identifiers
CAS Number	128-21-2
3D model (JSmol)	Interactive image
ChemSpider	198867
PubChem CID	228491
UNII	3KQ00893OL
CompTox Dashboard (EPA)	DTXSID00155766
- InChI: InChI=1S/C21H34O2/c1-13(22)17-6-7-18-16-5-4-14-12-15(23)8-10-20(14,2)19(16)9-11-21(17,18)3/h14-19,23H,4-12H2,1-3H3/t14-,15+,16+,17-,18+,19+,20+,21-/m1/s1 Key: AURFZBICLPNKBZ-GRWISUQFSA-N
- SMILES: CC(=O)[C@H]1CC[C@@H]2[C@@]1(CC[C@H]3[C@H]2CC[C@H]4[C@@]3(CC[C@@H](C4)O)C)C

Properties
Chemical formula	C_{21}H_{34}O_{2}
Molar mass	318.501 g·mol^{−1}
- Except where otherwise noted, data are given for materials in their standard state (at 25 °C [77 °F], 100 kPa). Infobox references

Epipregnanolone, also known as 3β-hydroxy-5β-pregnan-20-one, 3β,5β-tetrahydroprogesterone, or 3β,5β-THP, is an endogenous neurosteroid. It acts as a negative allosteric modulator of the GABA_{A} receptor and reverses the effects of potentiators like allopregnanolone. Epipregnanolone is biosynthesized from progesterone by the actions of 5β-reductase and 3β-hydroxysteroid dehydrogenase, with 5β-dihydroprogesterone as the intermediate in this two-step transformation.

Epipregnanolone is not a progestogen itself, but via metabolization into other steroids, behaves indirectly as one.

The sulfate of epipreganolone, epipregnanolone sulfate, is a negative allosteric modulator of the NMDA and GABA_{A} receptors and also acts as a TRPM3 channel activator.

== See also ==
- Isopregnanolone
- 3β-Dihydroprogesterone
- Pregnanolone
- 5α-Dihydroprogesterone
- 3β-Androstanediol
