= Dihydrocortisone =

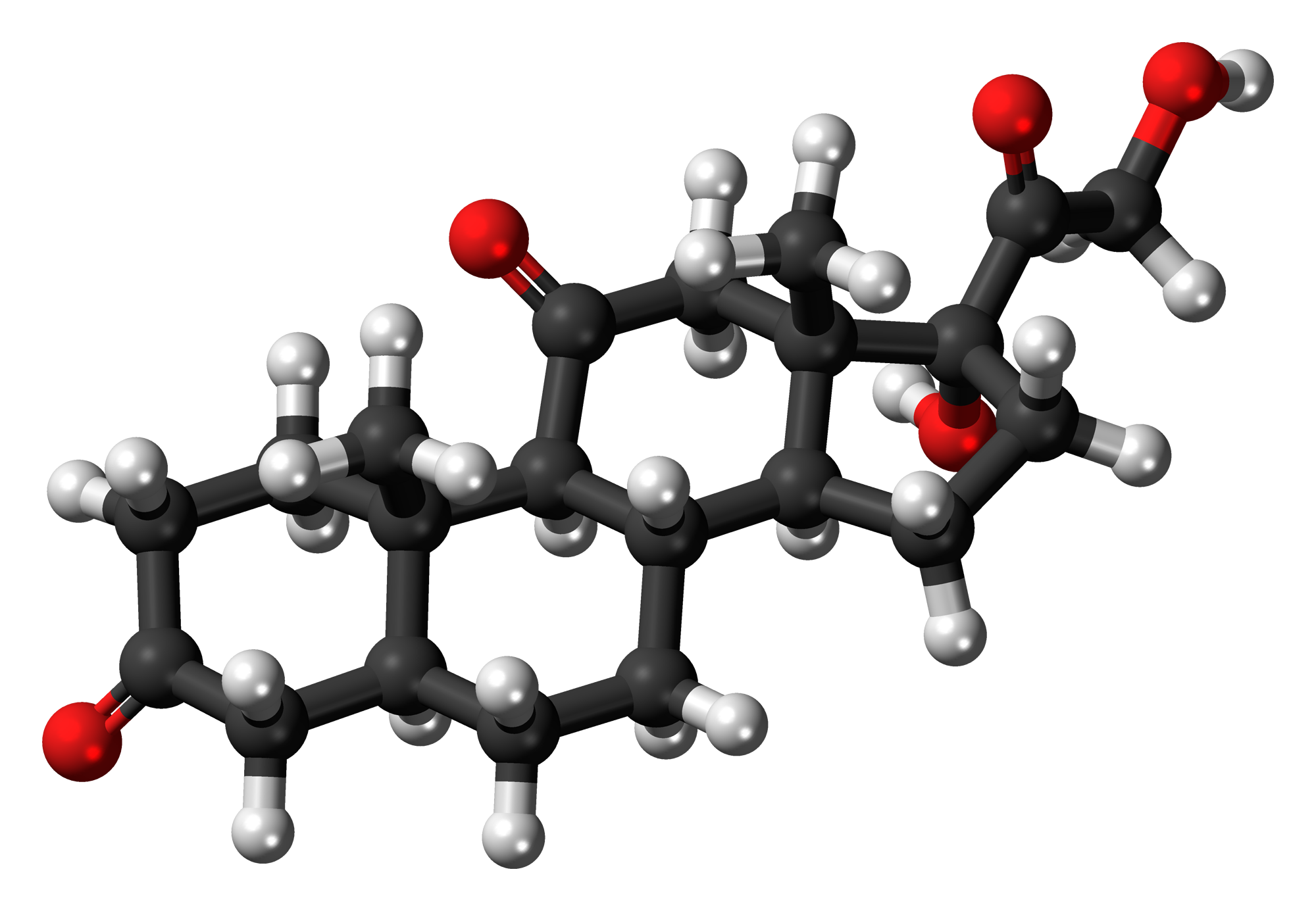

Names
- IUPAC name 17α,21-Dihydroxy-5β-pregnane-3,11,20-trione
- Systematic IUPAC name (1R,3aS,3bS,5aR,9aS,9bS,11aS)-1-(Hydroxyacetyl)-9a,11a-dimethyltetradecahydro-1H-cyclopenta[a]phenanthrene-7,10-dione

Identifiers
CAS Number	68-54-2
3D model (JSmol)	Interactive image
Beilstein Reference	3222844
ChEBI	CHEBI:18093
ChemSpider	58997
KEGG	C05469
PubChem CID	17756741
UNII	6F8SZ90823
CompTox Dashboard (EPA)	DTXSID70987415
- InChI: InChI=1S/C21H30O5/c1-19-7-5-13(23)9-12(19)3-4-14-15-6-8-21(26,17(25)11-22)20(15,2)10-16(24)18(14)19/h12,14-15,18,22,26H,3-11H2,1-2H3/t12-,14+,15+,18-,19+,20+,21+/m1/s1 Key: YCLWEYIBFOLMEM-FNLRALKVSA-N
- SMILES: O=C3C[C@@]1([C@@](O)(C(=O)CO)CC[C@H]1[C@@H]4CC[C@@H]2CC(=O)CC[C@]2(C)[C@@H]34)C

Properties
Chemical formula	C_{21}H_{30}O_{5}
Molar mass	362.4599
Density	1.244 g/cm^{3}

Hazards
Flash point	296.8 °C (566.2 °F; 570.0 K)
- Except where otherwise noted, data are given for materials in their standard state (at 25 °C [77 °F], 100 kPa). Infobox references

5β-Dihydrocortisone is an endogenous steroid formed from cortisone by the 5β-reductase enzyme, which uses nicotinamide adenine dinucleotide phosphate as its cofactor.

cortisone
+ NADPH
H^{+}
H^{+}
dihydrocortisone
+ NADP^{+}
