= 3β-Dihydroprogesterone =

Names
- IUPAC name 3β-Hydroxypregn-4-en-20-one
- Systematic IUPAC name 1-[(1S,3aS,3bS,7S,9aR,9bS,11aS)-7-Hydroxy-9a,11a-dimethyl-2,3,3a,3b,4,5,7,8,9,9a,9b,10,11,11a-tetradecahydro-1H-cyclopenta[a]phenanthren-1-yl]ethan-1-one
- Other names Pregn-4-en-3β-ol-20-one; 3β-Dihydroprogesterone; 3β-DHP; δ^{4}-Pregnenolone; 4-Pregnenolone

Identifiers
CAS Number	566-66-5
3D model (JSmol)	Interactive image
ChemSpider	19148924
PubChem CID	12838303
UNII	AW2D4ZZ5YQ
CompTox Dashboard (EPA)	DTXSID001047940
- InChI: InChI=1S/C21H32O2/c1-13(22)17-6-7-18-16-5-4-14-12-15(23)8-10-20(14,2)19(16)9-11-21(17,18)3/h12,15-19,23H,4-11H2,1-3H3/t15-,16-,17+,18-,19-,20-,21+/m0/s1 Key: QWVWXRKHAXWWSV-QGVNFLHTSA-N
- SMILES: CC(=O)[C@H]1CC[C@@H]2[C@@]1(CC[C@H]3[C@H]2CCC4=C[C@H](CC[C@]34C)O)C

Properties
Chemical formula	C_{21}H_{32}O_{2}
Molar mass	316.485 g/mol
- Except where otherwise noted, data are given for materials in their standard state (at 25 °C [77 °F], 100 kPa). Infobox references

3β-Dihydroprogesterone (3β-DHP), also known as 3β-hydroxyprogesterone, or pregn-4-en-3β-ol-20-one (4-pregnenolone, δ^{4}-pregnenolone), is an endogenous steroid. It is biosynthesized by 3β-hydroxysteroid dehydrogenase from progesterone. Unlike 3α-dihydroprogesterone (3α-DHP), 3β-DHP does not act as a positive allosteric modulator of the GABA_{A} receptor, which is in accordance with the fact that other 3β-hydroxylated progesterone metabolites such as isopregnanolone and epipregnanolone similarly do not act as potentiators of this receptor and instead inhibit it as well as reverse the effects of potentiators like allopregnanolone. 3β-DHP has been reported to possess about the same potency as progesterone in a bioassay of progestogenic activity, whereas 3α-DHP was not assessed.

== See also ==
- 5α-Dihydroprogesterone
- 5β-Dihydroprogesterone
- 3β-Androstanediol
- Pregnenolone
- Progesterone 3-acetyl enol ether
- Quingestrone
