= Ethynylandrostanediol =

Ethynylandrostanediol may refer to:

- 17α-Ethynyl-3α-androstanediol (a synthetic androstane steroid)
- 17α-Ethynyl-3β-androstanediol (a synthetic estrogen steroid)
