= Pregnanediol glucuronide =

Names
- IUPAC name (20S)-20-Hydroxy-5β-pregnan-3α-yl β-D-glucopyranosiduronic acid
- Systematic IUPAC name (2S,3S,4S,5R,6R)-3,4,5-Trihydroxy-6-({(1S,3aS,3bR,5aR,7R,9aS,9bS,11aS)-1-[(1S)-1-hydroxyethyl]-9a,11a-dimethylhexadecahydro-1H-cyclopenta[a]phenanthren-7-yl}oxy)oxane-2-carboxylic acid
- Other names Pregnanediol 3α-glucuronide; 5β-Pregnane-3α,20α-diol 3α-glucuronide

Identifiers
CAS Number	38055-17-3
3D model (JSmol)	Interactive image
ChEBI	CHEBI:88765
ChemSpider	110346
PubChem CID	123796
UNII	488GK5DQ5X
CompTox Dashboard (EPA)	DTXSID00191467
- InChI: InChI=1S/C27H44O8/c1-13(28)17-6-7-18-16-5-4-14-12-15(8-10-26(14,2)19(16)9-11-27(17,18)3)34-25-22(31)20(29)21(30)23(35-25)24(32)33/h13-23,25,28-31H,4-12H2,1-3H3,(H,32,33)/t13-,14+,15+,16-,17+,18-,19-,20-,21-,22+,23-,25+,26-,27+/m0/s1 Key: ZFFFJLDTCLJDHL-JQYCEVDMSA-N
- SMILES: C[C@@H]([C@H]1CC[C@@H]2[C@@]1(CC[C@H]3[C@H]2CC[C@H]4[C@@]3(CC[C@H](C4)O[C@H]5[C@@H]([C@H]([C@@H]([C@H](O5)C(=O)O)O)O)O)C)C)O

Properties
Chemical formula	C_{27}H_{44}O_{8}
Molar mass	496.641 g/mol
- Except where otherwise noted, data are given for materials in their standard state (at 25 °C [77 °F], 100 kPa). Infobox references

Pregnanediol glucuronide, or 5β-pregnane-3α,20α-diol 3α-glucuronide, is the major metabolite of progesterone and the C3α glucuronide conjugate of pregnanediol (5β-pregnane-3α,20α-diol). Approximately 15 to 30% of a parenteral dose of progesterone is metabolized into pregnanediol glucuronide by glucuronosyltransferase enzymes. While this specific isomer is referred to as pregnanediol glucuronide and is the most major form, there are actually many possible isomers of the metabolite.

pregnanediol
+ UDP-glucuronate
UDP
pregnanediol glucuronide
