= Isopregnanolone =

Names
- IUPAC name 3β-Hydroxy-5α-pregnan-20-one
- Systematic IUPAC name 1-[(1S,3aS,3bR,5aS,7S,9aS,9bS,11aS)-7-Hydroxy-9a,11a-dimethylhexadecahydro-1H-cyclopenta[a]phenanthren-1-yl]ethan-1-one
- Other names Isoallopregnanolone; Epiallopregnanolone; Sepranolone; 3β,5α-Tetrahydroprogesterone; 3β,5α-THP

Identifiers
CAS Number	516-55-2
3D model (JSmol)	Interactive image
ChemSpider	83761
ECHA InfoCard	100.007.478
PubChem CID	92787
UNII	3P8Z6V53MU
CompTox Dashboard (EPA)	DTXSID001023710
- InChI: InChI=1S/C21H34O2/c1-13(22)17-6-7-18-16-5-4-14-12-15(23)8-10-20(14,2)19(16)9-11-21(17,18)3/h14-19,23H,4-12H2,1-3H3/t14-,15-,16-,17+,18-,19-,20-,21+/m0/s1 Key: AURFZBICLPNKBZ-FZCSVUEKSA-N; InChI=1/C21H34O2/c1-13(22)17-6-7-18-16-5-4-14-12-15(23)8-10-20(14,2)19(16)9-11-21(17,18)3/h14-19,23H,4-12H2,1-3H3/t14-,15-,16-,17+,18-,19-,20-,21+/m0/s1 Key: AURFZBICLPNKBZ-FZCSVUEKBS
- SMILES: CC(=O)[C@H]1CC[C@@H]2[C@@]1(CC[C@H]3[C@H]2CC[C@@H]4[C@@]3(CC[C@@H](C4)O)C)C

Properties
Chemical formula	C_{21}H_{34}O_{2}
Molar mass	318.49 g/mol
- Except where otherwise noted, data are given for materials in their standard state (at 25 °C [77 °F], 100 kPa). Infobox references

Isopregnanolone, also known as isoallopregnanolone and epiallopregnanolone, as well as sepranolone (INN), and as 3β-hydroxy-5α-pregnan-20-one or 3β,5α-tetrahydroprogesterone (3β,5α-THP), is an endogenous neurosteroid and a natural 3β-epimer of allopregnanolone. It has been reported to act as a subunit-selective negative allosteric modulator of the GABA_{A} receptor, and antagonizes in animals and humans some but not all of the GABA_{A} receptor-mediated effects of allopregnanolone, such as anesthesia, sedation, and reduced saccadic eye movements, but not learning impairment. Isopregnanolone has no hormonal effects and appears to have no effect on the GABA_{A} receptor by itself; it selectively antagonizes allopregnanolone and does not affect the effects of other types of GABA_{A} receptor positive allosteric modulators such as benzodiazepines or barbiturates.

Isopregnanolone is synthesized from progesterone in the body by the actions of the enzymes 5α-reductase and 3β-hydroxysteroid dehydrogenase (with 5α-dihydroprogesterone as the intermediate in this two-step transformation) and can be reversibly metabolized into allopregnanolone by the enzyme 3α-hydroxysteroid dehydrogenase. Levels of isopregnanolone, progesterone, and allopregnanolone are highly correlated across the menstrual cycle and throughout pregnancy. The concentrations of isopregnanolone are significantly less than those of progesterone and allopregnanolone; about half of those of allopregnanolone, to be precise. Isopregnanolone has a relatively long serum elimination half-life of 14 hours in humans.

Isopregnanolone (developmental code name UC-1010) was under development for the treatment of premenstrual dysphoric disorder., however development was suspended indefinitely after phase IIb clinical trial results, while positive, showed an elevated placebo response rate. Development of isopregnanolone as a treatment for Tourette's syndrome has continued, with phase II trials planned to take place in 2026.

== See also ==
- List of neurosteroids
- List of investigational PMS/PMDD drugs
- List of investigational Tourette's syndrome drugs
- Epipregnanolone
- 3β-Dihydroprogesterone
- Pregnanolone
- 3β-Androstanediol
- Golexanolone
