= Allopregnanolone =

Endogenous inhibitory neurosteroid

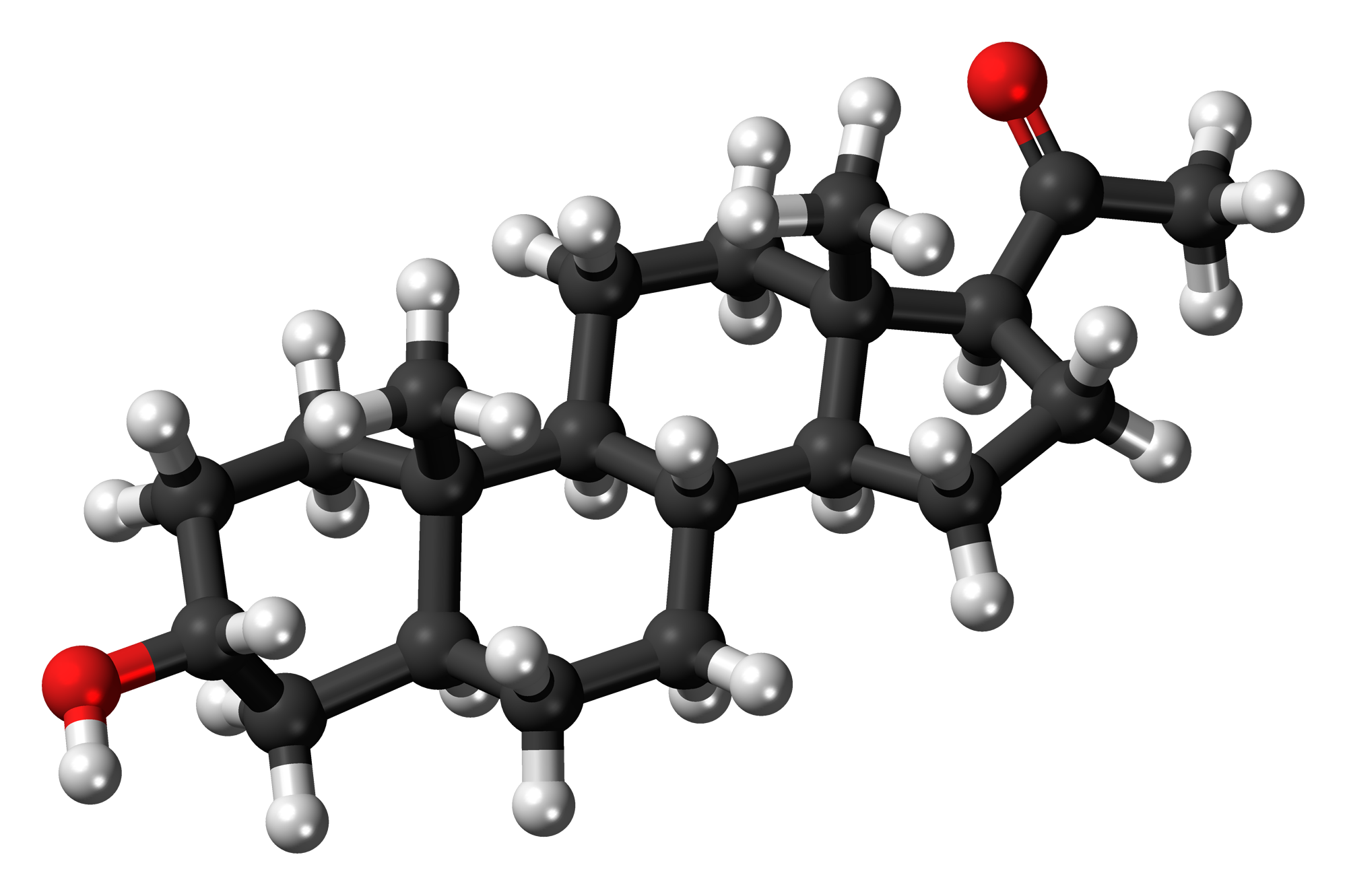

Clinical data
- Trade names: Zulresso
- Other names: ALLO; ALLOP; SAGE-547; SGE-102; 5α-Pregnan-3α-ol-20-one; 5α-Pregnane-3α-ol-20-one; 3α-Hydroxy-5α-pregnan-20-one; 3α,5α-Tetrahydroprogesterone; 3α,5α-THP, brexanolone (USAN US)
- AHFS/Drugs.com: Monograph
- MedlinePlus: a619037
- License data: US DailyMed: Brexanolone; US FDA: Zulresso
- Routes of administration: Intravenous
- Drug class: Neurosteroids; Antidepressants
- ATC code: N06AX29 (WHO)

Legal status
- Legal status: US: Schedule IV

Pharmacokinetic data
- Bioavailability: Oral: <5%
- Protein binding: >99%
- Metabolism: Non-CYP450 (keto-reduction via aldo-keto reductases (AKR), glucuronidation via glucuronosyltransferases (UGT), sulfation via sulfotransferases (SULT))
- Elimination half-life: 9 hours
- Excretion: Feces: 47% Urine: 42%

Identifiers
- IUPAC name: 1-[(3R,5S,8R,9S,10S,13S,14S,17S)-3-hydroxy-10,13-dimethyl-2,3,4,5,6,7,8,9,11,12,14,15,16,17-tetradecahydro-1H-cyclopenta[a]phenanthren-17-yl]ethanone
- CAS Number: 516-54-1
- PubChem CID: 92786
- DrugBank: DB11859
- ChemSpider: 83760
- UNII: S39XZ5QV8Y
- KEGG: D11149
- ChEBI: CHEBI:50169
- ChEMBL: ChEMBL207538
- CompTox Dashboard (EPA): DTXSID901016239 DTXSID1046342, DTXSID901016239

Chemical and physical data
- Formula: C_{21}H_{34}O_{2}
- Molar mass: 318.501 g·mol^{−1}
- 3D model (JSmol): Interactive image
- SMILES: CC(=O)[C@H]1CC[C@@H]2[C@@]1(CC[C@H]3[C@H]2CC[C@@H]4[C@@]3(CC[C@H](C4)O)C)C
- InChI: InChI=1S/C21H34O2/c1-13(22)17-6-7-18-16-5-4-14-12-15(23)8-10-20(14,2)19(16)9-11-21(17,18)3/h14-19,23H,4-12H2,1-3H3/t14-,15+,16-,17+,18-,19-,20-,21+/m0/s1; Key:AURFZBICLPNKBZ-SYBPFIFISA-N

Allopregnanolone (3α‑hydroxy‑5α‑pregnan‑20‑one) is an endogenous neuroactive steroid and potent positive allosteric modulator of the GABA_{A} receptor. It is synthesized both peripherally from progesterone and locally within the brain, where it contributes to tonic inhibition, stress regulation, arousal, and mood. Fluctuations in allopregnanolone levels are associated with pregnancy, the postpartum period, chronic stress, anxiety disorders, major depressive disorder, and several neurological conditions.

Allopregnanolone has significant clinical relevance as the prototype for neurosteroid‑based therapeutics. Its intravenous formulation, brexanolone, was approved in the United States in 2019 for postpartum depression and withdrawn in 2025. The orally active analog zuranolone was approved in 2023 for postpartum depression in the United States, United Kingdom, European Union, and Canada, and for major depressive disorder in Japan. Neurosteroid modulation of GABA_{A} receptors is an active area of research, with ongoing development of synthetic analogs and agents that enhance endogenous neurosteroid synthesis.

The concept of neurosteroids emerged in the early 1980s with the discovery that the brain synthesizes steroid hormones independently of peripheral endocrine glands and that these steroids directly modulate the GABA_{A} receptor, a major ligand-gated ion channel in the brain.

Allopregnanolone became the first well‑characterized endogenous positive modulator of GABA_{A} receptors, establishing a new field in neuropharmacology.

== Medical uses ==
Brexanolone was used to treat postpartum depression in adult women, administered as a continuous intravenous infusion over a period of 60 hours, and essential tremor.

== Clinical efficacy ==
Women experiencing moderate to severe postpartum depression when treated with a single dose of intravenous brexanolone display a significant reduction in HAM-D scores which persisted 30 days post-treatment.

== Side effects ==
Side effects of brexanolone include dizziness (10–20%), sedation (13–21%), headache (18%), nausea (10%), dry mouth (3–11%), loss of consciousness (3–5%), and flushing (2–5%). It can produce euphoria to a degree similar to that of alprazolam (3–13% at infusion doses of 90–270 μg over a one-hour period). Serious or severe adverse effects are rare but may include altered state of consciousness, syncope, presyncope, fatigue, and insomnia.

In the US, the Food and Drug Administration requires a Risk Evaluation and Mitigation Strategy (REMS) to counteract the risks of excessive sedation and loss of consciousness. It requires that all patients be monitored for those symptoms every 2 hours in planned non sleep periods and that oxygen saturation be monitored with continuous pulse oximetry.

== Biological function ==
Allopregnanolone possesses a wide variety of effects, including, in no particular order, antidepressant, anxiolytic, stress-reducing, rewarding, prosocial, antiaggressive, prosexual, sedative, pro-sleep, cognitive, memory-impairment, analgesic, anesthetic, anticonvulsant, neuroprotective, and neurogenic effects. Fluctuations in the levels of allopregnanolone and the other neurosteroids seem to play an important role in the pathophysiology of mood, anxiety, premenstrual syndrome, catamenial epilepsy, and various other neuropsychiatric conditions.

During pregnancy, allopregnanolone and pregnanolone are involved in sedation and anesthesia of the fetus.

Allopregnanolone is a metabolic intermediate in an androgen backdoor pathway from progesterone to dihydrotestosterone, which occurs during normal male fetus development; placental progesterone in the male fetus is the feedstock of this pathway; deficiencies in this pathway lead to insufficient virilization of the male fetus.

== Mechanism of action ==
=== Molecular interactions ===
Allopregnanolone is an endogenous inhibitory pregnane neurosteroid. It is made from pregnenolone, and is a positive allosteric modulator of the action of γ-aminobutyric acid (GABA) at GABA_{A} receptor. Allopregnanolone has effects similar to those of other positive allosteric modulators of the GABA action at GABA_{A} receptor such as the benzodiazepines, including anxiolytic, sedative, and anticonvulsant activity. Endogenously produced allopregnanolone exerts a neurophysiological role by fine-tuning of GABA_{A} receptor and modulating the action of several positive allosteric modulators and agonists at GABA_{A} receptor.

Allopregnanolone acts as a highly potent positive allosteric modulator of the GABA_{A} receptor. While allopregnanolone, like other inhibitory neurosteroids such as THDOC, positively modulates all GABA_{A} receptor isoforms, those isoforms containing δ subunits exhibit the greatest potentiation. Allopregnanolone has also been found to act as a positive allosteric modulator of the GABA_{A}-ρ receptor, though the implications of this action are unclear. In addition to its actions on GABA receptors, allopregnanolone, like progesterone, is known to be a negative allosteric modulator of nACh receptors, and also appears to act as a negative allosteric modulator of the 5-HT_{3} receptor. Along with the other inhibitory neurosteroids, allopregnanolone appears to have little or no action at other ligand-gated ion channels, including the NMDA, AMPA, kainate, and glycine receptors.

Unlike progesterone, allopregnanolone is inactive at the classical nuclear progesterone receptor (PR). However, allopregnanolone can be intracellularly oxidized into 5α-dihydroprogesterone, which does act as an agonist of the PR, and for this reason, allopregnanolone can produce PR-mediated progestogenic effects. (5α-dihydroprogesterone is reduced to produce allopregnanolone, and progesterone is reduced to produce 5α-dihydroprogesterone). In addition, allopregnanolone was reported in 2012 to be an agonist of the membrane progesterone receptors (mPRs) discovered shortly before, including mPRδ, mPRα, and mPRβ, with its activity at these receptors about a magnitude more potent than at the GABA_{A} receptor. The action of allopregnanolone at these receptors may be related, in part, to its neuroprotective and antigonadotropic properties. Also like progesterone, recent evidence has shown that allopregnanolone is an activator of the pregnane X receptor.

Similarly to many other GABA_{A} receptor positive allosteric modulators, allopregnanolone has been found to act as an inhibitor of L-type voltage-gated calcium channels (L-VGCCs), including α_{1} subtypes Ca_{v}1.2 and Ca_{v}1.3. However, the threshold concentration of allopregnanolone to inhibit L-VGCCs was determined to be 3 μM (3,000 nM), which is far greater than the concentration of 5 nM that has been estimated to be naturally produced in the human brain. Thus, inhibition of L-VGCCs is unlikely of any actual significance in the effects of endogenous allopregnanolone. Also, allopregnanolone, along with several other neurosteroids, has been found to activate the G protein-coupled bile acid receptor (GPBAR1, or TGR5). However, it is only able to do so at micromolar concentrations, which, similarly to the case of the L-VGCCs, are far greater than the low nanomolar concentrations of allopregnanolone estimated to be present in the brain.

==== Biphasic actions at the gaba_{a} receptor ====
Increased levels of allopregnanolone can produce paradoxical effects, including negative mood, anxiety, irritability, and aggression. This appears to be because allopregnanolone possesses biphasic, U-shaped actions at the GABA_{A} receptor – moderate level increases (in the range of 1.5–2 nmol/L total allopregnanolone, which are approximately equivalent to luteal phase levels) inhibit the activity of the receptor, while lower and higher concentration increases stimulate it. This seems to be a common effect of many GABA_{A} receptor positive allosteric modulators. In accordance, acute administration of low doses of micronized progesterone (which reliably elevates allopregnanolone levels) has been found to have negative effects on mood, while higher doses have a neutral effect.

=== Antidepressant effects ===
The mechanism by which neurosteroid GABA_{A} receptor positive allosteric modulators (PAMs) like brexanolone have antidepressant effects is unknown. Other GABA_{A} receptor PAMs, such as benzodiazepines, are not thought of as antidepressants and have no proven efficacy, although alprazolam has historically been prescribed for depression. Neurosteroid GABA_{A} receptor PAMs are known to interact with GABA_{A} receptors and subpopulations differently than benzodiazepines. GABA_{A} receptor-potentiating neurosteroids may preferentially target δ-subunit–containing GABA_{A} receptors, and enhance both tonic and phasic inhibition mediated by GABA_{A} receptors. It is possible that neurosteroids like allopregnanolone may act on other targets, including membrane progesterone receptors, T-type voltage-gated calcium channels, and others, to mediate antidepressant effects.

== Pharmacology ==
=== Pharmacokinetics ===
Brexanolone has low oral bioavailability of less than 5%, necessitating non-oral administration. The volume of distribution of brexanolone is approximately 3 L/kg. Its plasma protein binding is more than 99%. Brexanolone is metabolized by keto-reduction mediated via aldo-keto reductases. The compound is conjugated by glucuronidation via glucuronosyltransferases and sulfation via sulfotransferases. It is not metabolized significantly by the cytochrome P450 system. The three main metabolites of brexanolone are inactive. The elimination half-life of brexanolone is nine hours. Its total plasma clearance is 1 L/h/kg. It is excreted 47% in feces and 42% in urine. Less than 1% is excreted as unchanged brexanolone.

== Chemistry ==
Allopregnanolone is a pregnane (C21) steroid and is also known as 5α-pregnan-3α-ol-20-one, 5α-pregnane-3α-ol-20-one, 3α-hydroxy-5α-pregnan-20-one, or 3α,5α-tetrahydroprogesterone (3α,5α-THP). It is closely related structurally to 5-pregnenolone (pregn-5-en-3β-ol-20-dione), progesterone (pregn-4-ene-3,20-dione), the isomers of pregnanedione (5-dihydroprogesterone; 5-pregnane-3,20-dione), the isomers of 4-pregnenolone (3-dihydroprogesterone; pregn-4-en-3-ol-20-one), and the isomers of pregnanediol (5-pregnane-3,20-diol). In addition, allopregnanolone is one of four isomers of pregnanolone (3,5-tetrahydroprogesterone), with the other three isomers being pregnanolone (5β-pregnan-3α-ol-20-one), isopregnanolone (5α-pregnan-3β-ol-20-one), and epipregnanolone (5β-pregnan-3β-ol-20-one).

=== Biosynthesis ===
The biosynthesis of allopregnanolone in the brain starts with the conversion of progesterone into 5α-dihydroprogesterone by 5α-reductase. After that, 3α-hydroxysteroid dehydrogenase converts this intermediate into allopregnanolone. Allopregnanolone in the brain is produced by cortical and hippocampus pyramidal neurons and pyramidal-like neurons of the basolateral amygdala.

=== Derivatives ===
A variety of synthetic derivatives and analogues of allopregnanolone with similar activity and effects exist, including alfadolone (3α,21-dihydroxy-5α-pregnane-11,20-dione), alfaxolone (3α-hydroxy-5α-pregnane-11,20-dione), ganaxolone (3α-hydroxy-3β-methyl-5α-pregnan-20-one), hydroxydione (21-hydroxy-5β-pregnane-3,20-dione), minaxolone (11α-(dimethylamino)-2β-ethoxy-3α-hydroxy-5α-pregnan-20-one), Org 20599 (21-chloro-3α-hydroxy-2β-morpholin-4-yl-5β-pregnan-20-one), Org 21465 (2β-(2,2-dimethyl-4-morpholinyl)-3α-hydroxy-11,20-dioxo-5α-pregnan-21-yl methanesulfonate), and renanolone (3α-hydroxy-5β-pregnan-11,20-dione).

The 21-hydroxylated derivative of this compound, tetrahydrodeoxycorticosterone, is an endogenous inhibitory neurosteroid with similar properties to those of allopregnanolone, and the 3β-methyl analogue of allopregnanolone, ganaxolone, is under development to treat epilepsy and other conditions, including post-traumatic stress disorder.

== History ==
The pregnane steroid 3α hydroxy 5α pregnan 20 one (allopregnanolone) was first identified in peripheral tissues in 1938 by Beall and Reichstein during studies of progesterone metabolism. In the early 1980s Baulieu, Robel, Corpechot et al. detected several pregnane and Δ5 steroids in the brain, including pregnenolone, dehydroepiandrosterone, and 3α hydroxy 5α pregnan 20 one. They demonstrated that the concentrations of these steroids are maintained independently of peripheral endocrine glands, establishing that the central nervous system synthesizes steroid hormones de novo and introducing the concept of "neurosteroids".

In 1985 Majewska and colleagues demonstrated that endogenous steroids such as glucocorticoids can rapidly and directly modulate GABA_{A} receptor function, providing the first evidence of a fast non‑genomic mechanism of steroid action in the brain This observation led to their subsequent work which identified the pregnane steroid allopregnanolone in 1986 as a potent endogenous positive allosteric modulator of GABA_{A} receptors. Together with later publications in 1986–1988, including the first reviews of neurosteroid modulation of GABA_{A} receptors by Majewska.

First review paper on neurosteroid function in the brain - role in personality, mood, stress and disease, 1987

This research established allopregnanolone as the prototype neuroactive steroid and defined the initial framework of neurosteroid pharmacology. Clinical development of neurosteroid based therapeutics began in the 2000s. The intravenous formulation of allopregnanolone, SAGE 547 (brexanolone), entered clinical trials for postpartum depression in 2016 and became the first neurosteroid approved by the U.S. Food and Drug Administration in 2019..

Brexanolone was withdrawn from the U.S. market in 2025 for logistical and economic reasons. Zuranolone (SAGE 217), an orally active synthetic analog of allopregnanolone, was developed to provide a more practical neurosteroid therapy. It was approved in 2023 for postpartum depression in the United States, United Kingdom, European Union, and Canada, and in 2025 for major depressive disorder in Japan. Research continues on endogenous neurosteroid synthesis, selective GABAA receptor modulation, and next generation neuroactive steroid therapeutics.

== Society and culture ==
=== Names ===
Brexanolone is both the International Nonproprietary Name and the United States Adopted Name in the context of its use as a medication.

Zulresso is a brand name of the medication.

=== Legal status ===
In the United States, brexanolone is a Schedule IV controlled substance.

=== Commercial forms ===
Brexanolone was an aqueous mixture of synthetic allopregnanolone and sulfobutyl ether β-cyclodextrin (betadex sulfobutyl ether sodium), a solubilizing agent. It was provided at an allopregnanolone concentration of 100 mg/20 mL (5 mg/mL) in single-dose vials for use by intravenous infusion. Each mL of brexanolone solution contained 5 mg allopregnanolone, 250 mg sulfobutyl ether β-cyclodextrin, 0.265 mg citric acid monohydrate, 2.57 mg sodium citrate dihydrate, and water for injection. The solution was hypertonic and had to be diluted to a target concentration of 1 mg/mL with sterile water and sodium chloride prior to administration. Five infusion bags were generally required for the full infusion. More than five infusion bags were necessary for patients weighing more than 90 kg (200 lbs).

== Research ==
Brexanolone was under development as an intravenously administered medication for the treatment of major depressive disorder, super-refractory status epilepticus, and essential tremor, but development for these indications was discontinued.

It has been suggested that allopregnanolone and its precursor pregnenolone may have therapeutic potential for treatment of various symptoms of alcohol use disorders by restoring deficits in GABAergic inhibition, moderating corticotropin releasing factor (CRF) signaling, and inhibiting excessive neuroimmune activation. Many co-occurring symptoms of ethanol addiction (e.g., anxiety, depression, seizures, sleep disturbance, pain) that are believed to contribute to the downward spiral of the addiction may also be controlled with neuroactive steroids.

Exogenous progesterone, such as oral progesterone, elevates allopregnanolone levels in the body with good dose-to-serum level correlations. Due to this, it has been suggested that oral progesterone could be described as a prodrug of sorts for allopregnanolone. As a result, there has been some interest in using oral progesterone to treat catamenial epilepsy, as well as other menstrual cycle-related and neurosteroid-associated conditions. In addition to oral progesterone, oral pregnenolone has also been found to act as a prodrug of allopregnanolone, though also of pregnenolone sulfate.

In animal models of traumatic brain injury, allopregnanolone has been shown to reduce inflammation by attenuating the production of proinflammatory cytokines (IL-1β and TNF-α) at 3 h after the injury. It has also been shown to reduce the severity of brain damage and improve cognitive function and recovery.

== See also ==
- Brexanolone caprilcerbate
- Alfaxalone
