= 5β-Reductase =

Class of enzymes

Δ^{4}-3-Oxosteroid 5β-reductase

Identifiers
- EC no.: 1.3.1.3
- CAS no.: 2604034

Databases
- BRENDA: enzyme data
- ExPASy: NiceZyme view
- KEGG: enzyme entry
- MetaCyc: metabolic pathway
- Rhea: reactions
- PDB structures: RCSB PDB PDBe PDBsum
Search
- PMC: articles
- PubMed: articles
- NCBI: proteins

5β-Reductase, also called Δ^{4}-3-oxosteroid 5β-reductase (EC 1.3.1.3), is an enzyme that in humans is encoded by the gene AKC1D1. Its systematic name is 5β-cholestan-3-one:NADP^{+} 4,5-oxidoreductase.

This enzyme catalyses the following general chemical reaction:

5β-cholestan-3-one + NADP^{+} $\rightleftharpoons$ cholest-4-en-3-one + NADPH + H^{+}

For example, it interconverts 5β-dihydrocortisone and cortisone:

dihydrocortisone
+ NADP^{+}
H^{+}
H^{+}
cortisone
+ NADPH

== AKR1D1 ==
AKR1D1

Identifiers
- Aliases: AKR1D1, 3o5bred, CBAS2, SRD5B1, aldo-keto reductase family 1, member D1, aldo-keto reductase family 1 member D1
- External IDs: OMIM: 604741; MGI: 2384785; GeneCards: AKR1D1
Available structures
PDB	Ortholog search: PDBe RCSB
PDB	List of PDB id codes 3BUR, 3BUV, 3BV7, 3CAQ, 3CAS, 3CAV, 3CMF, 3COT, 3DOP, 3G1R, 3UZW, 3UZX, 3UZY, 3UZZ
Enzyme activity
EC #	BRENDA	ExPASy	KEGG	MetaCyc
1.3.1.3	↗	↗	↗	↗

Gene location (Human)
Chr.	Chromosome 7 (human)
Band	7q33	Start	138,002,324 bp
Band	7q33	End	138,118,305 bp

Gene location (Mouse)
Chr.	Chromosome 6 (mouse)
Band	6|6 B1	Start	37,507,108 bp
Band	6|6 B1	End	37,545,750 bp
RNA expression pattern
Bgee	Human / Mouse (ortholog); Top expressed in: liver; right lobe of liver; gonad; testicle; right testis; left testis; stromal cell of endometrium; lower lobe of lung; pancreatic ductal cell; epithelium of colon / Top expressed in: left lobe of liver; right kidney; proximal tubule; human kidney; sexually immature organism; lumbar spinal ganglion; lumbar subsegment of spinal cord; meninges; right ventricle; human fetus; More reference expression data
BioGPS	n/a
Gene ontology
Molecular function	delta4-3-oxosteroid 5beta-reductase activity; oxidoreductase activity; steroid binding; aldo-keto reductase (NADP) activity; alditol:NADP+ 1-oxidoreductase activity; alcohol dehydrogenase (NADP+) activity; steroid dehydrogenase activity; ketosteroid monooxygenase activity
Cellular component	cytoplasm; cytosol
Biological process	lipid catabolic process; digestion; bile acid catabolic process; steroid metabolic process; bile acid biosynthetic process; cholesterol catabolic process; androgen metabolic process; lipid metabolism; C21-steroid hormone metabolic process
Sources:Amigo / QuickGO
Orthologs
Databases	NCBI: entry; OMA: entry
Species	Human	Mouse
Entrez	6718	208665
Ensembl	ENSG00000122787	ENSMUSG00000038641
UniProt	P51857	Q8VCX1
RefSeq (mRNA)	NM_005989; NM_001190906; NM_001190907	NM_145364
RefSeq (protein)	NP_001177835; NP_001177836; NP_005980	NP_663339
Location (UCSC)	Chr 7: 138 – 138.12 Mb	Chr 6: 37.51 – 37.55 Mb
PubMed search
- Wikidata
View/Edit Human	View/Edit Mouse

Aldo-keto reductase family 1 member D1 (AKR1D1), the sole 5β-Reductase isozyme known in humans, is an enzyme which is humans is encoded by the gene AKR1D1. This enzyme is important for bile acid synthesis and steroid metabolism.

AKR1D1 efficiently acts on bile-acid intermediates, progesterone, 17α-hydroxyprogesterone, androstenedione, and testosterone to transform them into 5β-reduced metabolites. It can also act on aldosterone, corticosterone, and cortisol.

=== Medical significance ===
Pathogenic mutations in AKR1D1 are associated with a rare type of bile acid synthesis disorder called congenital bile acid synthesis defect 2 (CBAS2).

== Other names ==
This enzyme has multiple alternative names, including: 3-oxo-Δ^{4}-steroid 5β-reductase, androstenedione 5β-reductase, cholestenone 5β-reductase, cortisone 5β-reductase, cortisone Δ^{4}-5β-reductase, steroid 5β-reductase, testosterone 5β-reductase, Δ^{4}-3-ketosteroid 5β-reductase, Δ^{4}-5β-reductase, Δ^{4}-hydrogenase, 4,5β-dihydrocortisone:NADP^{+} Δ^{4}-oxidoreductase, and 3-oxo-5β-steroid:NADP^{+} Δ^{4}-oxidoreductase.

== See also ==
- 5α-Reductase
- Steroidogenic enzyme
