= Metabolic intermediate =

Compounds in biochemical reactions

Metabolic intermediates are compounds produced during the conversion of substrates (starting molecules) into final products in biochemical reactions within cells.

Although these intermediates are of relatively minor direct importance to cellular function, they can play important roles in the allosteric regulation of enzymes, glycolysis, the citric acid cycle, and amino acid synthesis.

Metabolic pathways consist of a series of enzymatically catalyzed reactions where each step transforms a substrate into a product that serves as the substrate for the next reaction. Metabolic intermediates are compounds that form during these steps, and they are neither the starting substrate nor the final product of the pathway. These intermediates are crucial because they allow for regulation, energy storage, and extraction of chemical energy in a controlled manner.

== Types of Metabolic Intermediates ==
Metabolic intermediates can belong to different biochemical classes based on the type of pathway they are involved in. Some examples include:

- Carbohydrate intermediates: In carbohydrate metabolism, intermediates such as glucose-6-phosphate and fructose-1,6-bisphosphate appear during glycolysis and gluconeogenesis.
- Amino acid intermediates: During amino acid biosynthesis or degradation, intermediates such as 2-oxoglutarate, pyruvate, or oxaloacetate are produced. These intermediates also link to the citric acid cycle.
- Lipid intermediates: Fatty acid metabolism involves intermediates like acyl-CoA derivatives during β-oxidation or fatty acid synthesis.
- Nucleotide intermediates: The metabolism of nucleotides, the building blocks of DNA and RNA, includes intermediates like inosine monophosphate (IMP), which is part of purine biosynthesis.

== Clinical significance ==
Some can be useful in measuring rates of metabolic processes (for example, 3,4-dihydroxyphenylacetic acid or 3-aminoisobutyrate).

Because they can represent unnatural points of entry into natural metabolic pathways, some (such as AICA ribonucleotide) are of interest to researchers in developing new therapies.

== See also ==
- Metabolism
- Metabolome
- Metabolomics
- Primary metabolite
- Secondary metabolite
