= AKR1 =

Family of aldo-keto reductase enzymes

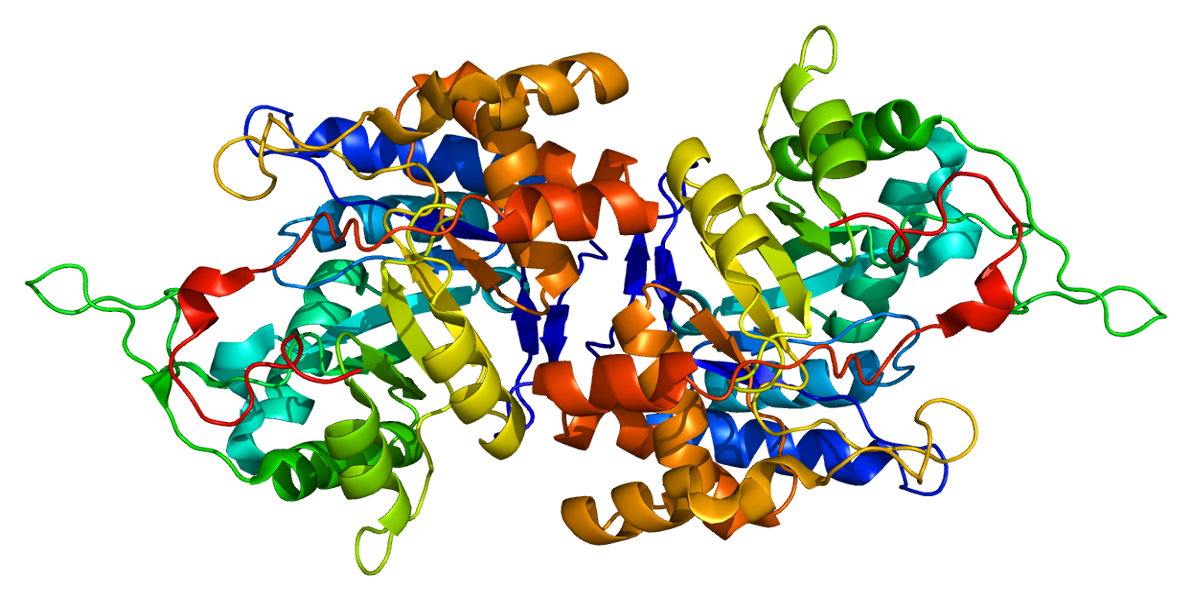
AKR1C1, a member of the AKR1 family.

Aldo-keto reductase family 1 (AKR1) is a family of aldo-keto reductase enzymes that is involved in steroid metabolism. It includes the AKR1C and AKR1D subgroups, which respectively consist of AKR1C1–AKR1C4 and AKR1D1. Together with short-chain dehydrogenase/reductases (SDRs), these enzymes catalyze oxidoreductions, act on the C3, C5, C11, C17 and C20 positions of steroids, and function as 3α-HSD, 3β-HSDs, 5β-reductases, 11β-HSDs, 17β-HSDs, and 20α-HSDs, respectively. The AKR1C enzymes act as 3-, 17- and 20-ketosteroid reductases, while AKR1D1 acts as the sole 5β-reductase in humans.

== Members ==
AKR1A1; AKR1B1; AKR1B10; AKR1C1; AKR1C2; AKR1C3; AKR1C4; AKR1D1; Others

== See also ==
- Steroidogenic enzyme
