= Androgen backdoor pathway =

Series of interconnected biochemical reactions

Figure 1. Schematic diagram of the canonical (left), backdoor (middle), and 11-oxy backdoor (right) pathways of androgen biosynthesis

The androgen backdoor pathway (the backdoor pathway of androgen biosynthesis) is a metabolic route in which androgens are produced from 21-carbon (C_{21}) steroids bypassing testosterone and androstenedione as intermediates.

This process starts with 21-carbon (C_{21}) steroids, also known as pregnanes, and involves a step called "5α-reduction". This pathway does not require the intermediate formation of testosterone, hence the term "bypassing testosterone" is sometimes used in medical literature as the hallmark feature of this way of androgen biosynthesis. This feature is a key distinction from the conventional, canonical androgenic pathway, which necessitates the involvement of testosterone as an intermediate in the synthesis of androgens.

These alternate androgen pathways are active in early male sexual development. In individuals with congenital adrenal hyperplasia due to enzyme deficiencies like 21-hydroxylase or cytochrome P450 oxidoreductase deficiency, these pathways can activate at any age with increased levels of precursors like progesterone or 17α-hydroxyprogesterone. This activation can lead to symptoms of hyperandrogenism such as acne, hirsutism, polyendocrine metabolic ovarian syndrome (PMOS), or prostate enlargement.

In the canonical pathway, dihydrotestosterone is directly synthesized from testosterone by the enzyme 5α-reductase, primarily in tissues where it exerts its effect, such as the prostate gland, hair follicles, and skin. Both pathways rely on 5α-reductase, but in the androgen backdoor pathway, this enzyme acts on C_{21} steroids (pregnanes), initiating a series of chemical reactions that eventually lead to dihydrotestosterone production. In contrast, in the canonical pathway, 5α-reductase targets the 4,5-double bond in testosterone, producing dihydrotestosterone directly.

The backdoor pathway was initially described as a biosynthetic route where 5α-reduction of 17α-hydroxyprogesterone ultimately leads to dihydrotestosterone. Since then, several other pathways have been discovered that lead to 11-oxygenated androgens which are also physiologically significant.

== Function ==
Androgens that bind to and activate the androgen receptor have numerous physiological functions which can broadly divided into androgenic (male sexual development) and anabolic (building muscle and bone). The anabolic effects are important in both males and females, although females have lower circulating levels of androgens. The physiologically most important androgens are testosterone (T) and dihydrotestosterone (DHT), which are considered classical androgens because their role in human health was discovered in 1930s. However, much later, in 2010s, the role in human health of 11-oxygenated androgens was established, namely, of 11-ketotestosterone (11KT) and 11-ketodihydrotestosterone (11KDHT), that both bind and activate the human androgen receptor with affinities, potencies, and efficacies that are similar to that of testosterone (T) and DHT, respectively, although 11-oxygenated androgens were long known to be principal androgens in teleost fishes.

The main biochemical route to T and DHT is the canonical (classical) pathway that proceeds from pregnenolone (P5). Alternatively, DHT but not T can be produced through a backdoor pathway that proceeds from 17α-hydroxyprogesterone (17OHP) or progesterone (P4). The function of androgen backdoor pathways is to produce physiologically significant androgens in normal conditions where the conventional pathway is insufficient, such as in male early sexual differentiation. Sexual differentiation is a process by which hormones determine anatomic phenotype, mainly the development of the reproductive organs. DHT is the most important androgenic hormone and is a product of both canonical and backdoor pathways. Additionally, 11KDHT but not 11KT can be biosynthesized from the C11-oxy backdoor pathway starting from progesterone (P4). These C11-oxy androgens can contribute to the pathology of congenital adrenal hyperplasia, polyendocrine metabolic ovarian syndrome (PMOS), and prostate cancer.

The androgen backdoor route is activated during normal prenatal development and leads to early male sexual differentiation. Dihydrotestosterone synthesized by this route plays a critical role in the development of male sexual characteristics, including the differentiation and maturation of the male external genitalia, the prostate gland, and other male reproductive structures. By bypassing the conventional intermediates (A4 and T), this pathway ensures the timely and appropriate development of male sexual traits in early embryonic and fetal stages. Both canonical and backdoor pathways are essential in normal male embryonic development. A disruption in the backdoor pathway can lead to incomplete or altered male sexual differentiation. This disruption may result in abnormalities or underdevelopment of the male external genitalia, prostate gland, and other male reproductive structures. The specific consequences can vary depending on the nature and extent of the disruption and may lead to conditions such as ambiguous genitalia or other disorders of sexual development (DSD), where the individual's physical and sexual characteristics do not align clearly with typical male, i.e., undervirilization of male infants. Undervirilization refers to insufficient development of male characteristics due to below-normal effects of androgens during prenatal development. After birth, it may manifest as markedly underdeveloped male genitalia.

The backdoor pathway of DHT biosynthesis from 17OHP to DHT was first described in the marsupials and later confirmed in humans. Both the canonical and backdoor pathways of DHT biosynthesis are required for normal development of male genitalia in humans. As such, defects in the backdoor pathway from 17α-hydroxyprogesterone (17OHP) or progesterone (P4) to DHT lead to undervirilization in male fetuses because placental P4 is the precursor of DHT via the backdoor pathway.

In 21-hydroxylase deficiency or cytochrome P450 oxidoreductase deficiency, even a mild increase in circulating P4 or 17-OHP levels may activate this pathway, regardless of the patient's age and sex.

== Mechanism ==
=== Androgen signaling ===
The androgen response mechanism involves androgens binding to androgen receptors in the cytoplasm, which then move into the nucleus and control gene transcription by interacting with specific DNA regions called androgen response elements. This response mechanism is involved in male sexual differentiation and puberty, as well as other tissue types and processes, such as the prostate gland (regulate secretory functions), hair follicles (androgens influence hair growth patterns), skin (androgens regulate sebum production and the thickening and maturation of the skin), and muscle (contribute to the development and maintenance of muscle mass and strength). Such tissues, where androgens exert their effects, are called 'androgen target tissues'.

Different androgens have different effects on androgen receptors because they have different degrees of binding and activating the receptors. Physiologically significant androgens are those androgens that have a strong influence on the development and functioning of male sexual characteristics, unlike physiologically insignificant androgens, which have low biological activity or are quickly metabolized into other steroids. Physiologically insignificant androgens do not have a notable influence on the development and functioning of male or female sexual characteristics, they can be products of the metabolism of more active androgens, such as testosterone (T), or their precursors.

=== Androgen biosynthesis ===
Numbering of carbon atoms in a prototypical steroid nucleus

The androgen backdoor pathways are vital for creating androgens from 21-carbon (C_{21}) steroids, known as pregnanes. A 21-carbon steroid is a steroid molecule with 21 carbon atoms, hence, their chemical formula contains C_{21}. For example, the chemical formula of progesterone is C_{21}H_{30}O_{2}. For this reason, 21-carbon steroids are denoted as C_{21}-steroids, 19-carbon steroids are denoted as C_{19} steroids, and so on. The androgen backdoor pathways occur without the involvement of testosterone (T) and/or androstenedione (A4), which are part of the conventional, canonical (classic) androgenic pathway.

In the canonical pathways of androgen biosynthesis, DHT is synthesized from T via 5α-reduction, so that 5α-reduction of T, a C_{19} steroid, is the last step of the pathway (see Dihydrotestosterone § Biosynthesis). In the backdoor pathways, to the contrary, 5α-reduction of C_{21} steroids is the first step. The 5α-reduction is a chemical reaction where a functional group attached to the carbon in position 5α of the steroid nucleus is reduced, and a double bond between carbon atoms numbered 4 and 5 in the steroid molecule is replaced to the single bond in a chemical reaction catalyzed by the SRD5A1 enzyme.

The androgen backdoor pathways can be also activated in pathologic conditions (diseases), such as congenital adrenal hyperplasia (CAH), leading to hyperandrogenism.

== Biochemistry ==
=== Canonical biosynthesis ===
Canonical (left) vs backdoor (right) pathways of androgen biosynthesis. Key 5α-reduction steps (catalyzed by SRD5A1/2/3) highlighted in pink.

In the canonical androgen biosynthesis pathway, dihydrotestosterone (DHT) is synthesized irreversibly from testosterone (T) by the enzyme 5α-reductase, while T is synthesized from androstenediol (A5) or androstenedione (A4), which all are C_{19} steroids (androgens). The 5α-reduction of T occurs in various tissues including the genitals (penis, scrotum, clitoris, labia majora), prostate gland, skin, hair follicles, liver, and brain. Around 5 to 7% of T undergoes 5α-reduction into DHT in male adults. The liver is the main source of circulating DHT regardless of sex. Sex hormone-binding globulin (SHBH) transports the majority of circulating T to the cells of androgen target tissues, where it is then 5α-reduced to DHT. In adult males, approximately 70% of circulating DHT is produced by the peripheral conversion of T in non-gonadal tissues, with the remaining 30% directly secreted by the testes or adrenals; the prostate does not contribute to circulating DHT. In females, particularly from puberty onward, circulating DHT is almost entirely generated by peripheral conversion, resulting in levels that are only 3-10% of those found for T.

=== Backdoor biosynthesis ===
Enzymes involved in canonical and backdoor DHT biosynthesis
Gene	Enzyme	Pathway	Directional preference	Tissue distribution
AKR1C1	3α-HSD4	Backdoor	Reductive	Liver, testis, lung, breast, uterus, brain
AKR1C2	3α-HSD3	Backdoor	Reductive	Liver, prostate, lung, uterus, brain
AKR1C3	3α-HSD2	Backdoor	Reductive	Prostate, breast, liver, adrenal, testis, lung
AKR1C4	3α-HSD1	Backdoor	Reductive	Liver >> adrenal/gonad
HSD3B1	3β-HSD1	Backdoor/Canonical	Oxidative	Testis, adrenal, placenta
HSD3B2	3β-HSD2	Backdoor/Canonical	Oxidative	Testis, adrenal
HSD17B3	17β-HSD3	Backdoor/Canonical	Oxidative	Leydig cells (testis)
HSD17B6	17β-HSD6 (RoDH)	Backdoor	Oxidative	Prostate
SRD5A1	5α-reductase, type 1	Backdoor/Canonical	Reductive	Wide tissue expression
SRD5A2	5α-reductase, type 2	Backdoor/Canonical	Reductive	Prostate
SRD5A3	5α-reductase, type 3	Backdoor/Canonical	Reductive	Wide tissue expression
StAR	steroidogenic acute regulatory protein	Backdoor/Canonical	N/A	Adrenal gland and Leydig cells
CYP11A1	P450scc	Backdoor/Canonical	Oxidative	Adrenal gland and testis
CYP17A1	Steroid 17-alpha-hydroxylase	Backdoor/Canonical	Oxidative	Adrenal gland and testis
POR	cytochrome b5, P450 oxidoreductase	Backdoor/Canonical	N/A	Liver, lower levels in other tissues

What distinguishes the androgen backdoor from the classical pathway is whether 5α-reduction initiates or terminates the pathway. In the backdoor pathway, 5α-reduction of progesterone (P4) or 17α-hydroxyprogesterone (17OHP) occurs at or near the beginning of the pathway respectively. Conversely, in the classical pathway, 5α-reduction is the final step, where testosterone is converted into dihydrotestosterone (DHT).

The backdoor pathway splits into two subpathways at P4, proceeding through either 17OHP or 5α-DHP before merging again at 5α-Pdiol. The biosynthetic intermediate 5α-Pdiol in turn is converted into DHT in two chemical steps.

==== 17OHP subpathway ====
The first step of this pathway is the 5α-reduction of 17OHP to 5α-pregnan-17α-ol-3,20-dione (referred to as 17OHDHP or 17α-hydroxy-dihydroprogesterone). The reaction is catalyzed by SRD5A1. 17OHDHP is then converted to 5α-pregnane-3α,17α-diol-20-one (5α-Pdiol) via 3α-reduction by a 3α-hydroxysteroid dehydrogenase isozyme (AKR1C2 and AKR1C4) or HSD17B6, that also has 3α-reduction activity. The pathway then proceeds from 5α-Pdiol the same way as the pathway that starts from P4, i.e. 5α-Pdiol → AST → 3α-diol → DHT.

The pathway can be summarized as: 17OHP → 17OHDHP → 5α-Pdiol → AST → 3α-diol → DHT.

==== 5α-DHP subpathway ====
The pathway from progesterone (P4) to DHT is similar to that described above from 17OHP to DHT, but the initial substrate for 5α-reductase is P4 rather than 17OHP. Placental P4 in the male fetus is the feedstock, that is, a starting point, the initial substrate, for the backdoor pathway found operating in multiple non-gonadal tissues.

The first step in this pathway is 5α-reduction of P4 toward 5α-dihydroprogesterone (5α-DHP) by SRD5A1. 5α-DHP is then converted to allopregnanolone (AlloP5) via 3α-reduction by AKR1C2 or AKR1C4. AlloP5 is then converted to 5α-Pdiol by the 17α-hydroxylase activity of CYP17A1. 5α-Pdiol is also known as 17α-hydroxyallopregnanolone or 17OH-allopregnanolone. 5α-Pdiol is then converted to 5α-androstan-3α-ol-17-one, also known as androsterone (AST) by 17,20-lyase activity of CYP17A1 which cleaves a side-chain (C17-C20 bond) from the steroid nucleus, converting a C_{21} steroid (a pregnane) to a C_{19} steroid (an androstane or androgen). AST is 17β-reduced to 5α-androstane-3α,17β-diol (3α-diol) by HSD17B3 or AKR1C3. The final step is 3α-oxidation of 3α-diol in target tissues to DHT by an enzyme that has 3α-hydroxysteroid oxidase activity, such as AKR1C2, HSD17B6, HSD17B10, RDH16, RDH5, and DHRS9. This oxidation is not required in the classical androgen pathway. The pathway can be summarized as: P4 → 5α-DHP → AlloP5 → 5α-Pdiol → AST → 3α-diol → DHT.

=== 11-Oxygenated androgen backdoor biosynthesis ===
The backdoor pathways from progesterone or 17α-hydroxyprogesterone to 11-ketodihydrotestosterone (rose background). The two groups of steroids are distinguished by the carbon 17 substituent configuration associated with four distinct precursors. The first group is the conversion of progesterone. The second group is the conversion of 17-hydroxyprogesterone. CYP17A1 catalyzes the C_{21} steroids (pregnanes) to C_{19} steroids (androstanes). Some transformations which are presumed to exist but not yet shown to exist are depicted with dotted arrows. Some CYP17A1 mediated reactions that transform 11-oxygenated androgens classes (gray box) are omitted for clarity. Δ^{5} compounds that are transformed to Δ^{4} compounds are also omitted for clarity.

There are two known physiologically and clinically significant 11-oxygenated androgens, 11-ketotestosterone (11KT) and 11-ketodihydrotestosterone (11KDHT), which both bind and activate the androgen receptor with affinities, potencies, and efficacies that are similar to that of testosterone (T) and DHT, respectively.

As for 11β-hydroxytestosterone (11OHT) and 11β-hydroxydihydrotestosterone (11OHDHT), the androgenicity of these steroids is a point of research. Although some studies suggest that though 11β-hydroxytestosterone (11OHT) and 11β-hydroxydihydrotestosterone (11OHDHT) may not have significant androgenic activity as they were once thought to possess, they may still be important precursors to androgenic molecules. The relative importance of the androgens depends on their activity, circulating levels, and stability. The steroids 11β-hydroxyandrostenedione (11OHA4) and 11-ketoandrostenedione (11KA4) have been established as having minimal androgen activity, but remain important molecules in this context since they act as androgen precursors.

Still, of all physiologically and clinically significant 11-oxygenated androgens, only 11KDHT (but not 11KT) is biosynthesized via a backdoor pathway.

The backdoor pathways to 11-oxygenated androgens can be broadly defined as two Δ^{4} steroid entry points (17OHP and P4) that can undergo a common sequence of several transformations:

- 11β-hydroxylation of 17OHP or P4 by CYP11B1 in the adrenal cortex into 21dF or 11OHP4, respectively,
- 5α-reduction by SRD5A1/SRD5A2,
- cleavage of a side-chain (C17-C20 bond) from the steroid nucleus by 17,20-lyase activity of CYP17A1 which converts a C_{21} steroid to a C_{19} steroid,
- 17β-reduction by AKR1C3 (an oxo (=O) functional group in position 17β replaced to the hydroxyl (−OH) functional group),
- reversible 11β-reduction/oxidation of the ketone or alcohol (an oxo (=O) functional group or hydroxyl (−OH) functional group, respectively) by HSD11B1/HSD11B2.
- reversible 3β-reduction/oxidation of the ketone or alcohol (an oxo (=O) functional group or hydroxyl (−OH) functional group, respectively) by AKR1C2 or AKR1C4.

== Clinical significance ==
=== Congenital adrenal hyperplasia ===
In congenital adrenal hyperplasia (CAH) due to deficiency of 21-hydroxylase or cytochrome P450 oxidoreductase (POR), the associated elevated 17OHP levels result in flux through the backdoor pathway to DHT that begins with 5α-reduction of 17OHP. This pathway may be activated regardless of age and sex and cause symptoms of androgen excess. In adult females, excess androgens can cause hirsutism (excessive hair growth), alopecia (hair loss), menstrual irregularities, infertility, and polyendocrine metabolic ovarian syndrome (PMOS). In adult males, excess androgens can cause prostate enlargement, prostate cancer, and reduced sperm quality. In adults of both sexes, excess androgens can also cause metabolic disturbances, such as insulin resistance, dyslipidemia, hypertension, and cardiovascular disease. In fetus, excess of androgens due to excess of fetal 17OHP in CAH may contribute to DHT synthesis that leads to external genital virilization in newborn girls with CAH. P4 levels may also be elevated in CAH, leading to androgen excess via the backdoor pathway from P4 to DHT. 17OHP and P4 may also be substrates for 11-oxygenated androgens in CAH.

Masculinization of female external genitalia in a fetus due to the mother's intake of certain exogenous hormones—the so-called progestin-induced virilization—is usually less noticeable than in congenital adrenal hyperplasia (CAH), and unlike CAH, it does not cause progressive virilization.

Serum levels of the C_{21} 11-oxygenated steroids: 21-deoxycorticosterone, also known as 11β-hydroxyprogesterone (11OHP4) and 21-deoxycortisol (21dF), have been known to be elevated in both non-classical and classical forms of CAH, and liquid chromatography–mass spectrometry profiles that include these steroids have been proposed for clinical applications, including newborn screening. Classical CAH patients receiving glucocorticoid therapy had C_{19} 11-oxygenated steroid serum levels that were elevated compared to healthy controls. In CAH patients with poor disease control, 11-oxygenated androgens remain elevated for longer than 17OHP, thus serving as a better biomarker for the effectiveness of the disease control. In males with CAH, 11-oxygenated androgen levels may indicate the presence of testicular adrenal rest tumors.

=== Development of the reproductive system ===
In order for the male genitalia to develop properly in humans, both the classical and backdoor pathways are essential as means of DHT biosynthesis. Deficiencies in the backdoor pathway that converts 17OHP or P4 into DHT can result in undervirilization of the male fetus. This underviriliztion may happen because placental P4 acts as an important precursor to fetal DHT specifically within the backdoor pathway that should not be disrupted.

Undervirilization refers to an incomplete masculinization of the male fetus. This condition can have consequences such as ambiguous genitalia or underdeveloped reproductive organs including the penis and testes. These conditions may impact fertility, sexual function, and can also affect an individual's overall gender identity later in life.

A case study involving five individuals with a 46,XY (male) chromosomal pattern from two families revealed that their DSD, manifested in unusual genital appearance, was caused by mutations in the AKR1C2 and/or AKR1C4 genes. These genes are exclusively involved in the backdoor pathway of dihydrotestosterone (DHT) production. Mutations in the AKR1C3 and genes involved in the classical androgen pathway were excluded as the causes for the atypical genital appearance. Interestingly, their female relatives with a 46,XX chromosomal pattern who had the same mutations exhibited normal physical characteristics and fertility. Although both AKR1C2 and AKR1C4 enzymes are needed for DHT synthesis in a backdoor pathway, the study found that mutations in AKR1C2 only were sufficient for disruption. However, these AKR1C2/AKR1C4 variants leading to DSD are rare and have been only so far reported in just those two families. This case study highlights the role of AKR1C2/4 in the alternative androgen pathways.

Isolated 17,20-lyase deficiency syndrome due to variants in CYP17A1, cytochrome b_{5}, and POR may also disrupt the backdoor pathway to DHT, as the 17,20-lyase activity of CYP17A1 is required for both classical and backdoor androgen pathways. This rare deficiency can lead to DSD in both sexes, with affected girls being asymptomatic until puberty, when they show amenorrhea.

11-oxygenated androgens may play important roles in DSDs. 11-oxygenated androgen fetal biosynthesis may coincide with the key stages of production of cortisol — at weeks 8–9, 13–24, and from 31 and onward. In these stages, impaired CYP17A1 and CYP21A2 activity lead to increased ACTH due to cortisol deficiency and the accumulation of substrates for CYP11B1 in pathways to 11-oxygenated androgens and could cause abnormal female fetal development (virilization).

=== Benign prostatic hyperplasia and prostatitis ===
Androgens are involved in prostate-related conditions such as benign prostatic hyperplasia (BPH), chronic prostatitis/chronic pelvic pain syndrome (CP/CPPS), and prostate cancer. In BPH, C_{21} 11-oxygenated steroids (pregnanes) have been identified are precursors to androgens. Specifically, steroids like 11β-hydroxyprogesterone (11OHP4) and 11-ketoprogesterone (11KP4) can be converted to 11-ketodihydrotestosterone (11KDHT), an 11-oxo form of DHT with the same potency. These precursors have also been detected in tissue biopsy samples from patients with BPH, as well as in their serum levels. The relationship between steroid serum levels and CP/CPPS suggests that deficiencies in the enzyme CYP21A2 may contribute to the development of this condition. Non-classical congenital adrenal hyperplasia (CAH) resulting from CYP21A2 deficiency is typically considered asymptomatic in men. However, non-classical CAH could be a comorbidity associated with CP/CPPS.

=== Prostate cancer ===
The backdoor pathway to DHT plays a role in the development of androgen-sensitive cancers, such as prostate cancer. In some cases, tumor cells have been found to possess higher levels of enzymes involved in this pathway, resulting in increased production of DHT.

Androgen deprivation therapy (ADT) is a common treatment for prostate cancer, which involves reducing the levels of androgens, specifically T and DHT, in the body. This treatment is done through the use of medications that aim to block the production or action of these hormones. While ADT can be effective in slowing the growth of prostate cancer, it also has several drawbacks, one of which is the potential for increased production of P4 and activation of the backdoor pathway of DHT biosynthesis where P4 is a substrate. Normally, this pathway is not very active in healthy adult males, as the majority of DHT is produced through the classical pathway, which involves the direct conversion of T into DHT by one of the SRD5A isozymes. However, when T levels are reduced through ADT, the body may compensate by increasing the production of P4, which the backdoor pathway can then use as a substrate. One of the main drawbacks of this increased production of P4 leads to an increase in DHT levels, which fuel the growth of prostate cancer cells. This increased production of P4 and DHT can result in the cancer becoming resistant to ADT and continuing to grow and spread. Additionally, the increased levels of P4 can also cause side effects such as weight gain, fatigue, and mood swings (extreme or rapid changes in mood).

In prostate cancer, removal of testicular T through castration (surgical or chemical removal or inactivation of testicles) helps eliminate the growth-promoting effects of androgens. However, in some cases, metastatic tumors can develop into castration-resistant prostate cancer (CRPC). While castration reduces serum T levels by 90-95%, it only decreases DHT in the prostate gland by 50%. This difference between the magnitude of androgen levels confirms that the prostate has enzymes capable of producing DHT even without testicular T. In addition to DHT production within the prostate, researchers found that 11-oxygenated androgens play a role in maintaining total circulating androgen pool levels which are relevant to the amounts of clinically significant androgens in the body. These 11-oxygenated androgens contribute greatly to reactivating androgen signaling in patients with CRPC. 11-oxygenated androgens make up around 60% of the total active androgen pool in such patients. Unlike T or DHT, these levels of 11-oxygenated androgens remain unaffected by castration therapy.

== History ==
The backdoor pathway to DHT biosynthesis was discovered in early 2000s in the marsupials and later confirmed in humans. That is why the backdoor pathway of DHT biosynthesis from 17OHP can be called a marsupial pathway. This pathway is also present in other mammals, such as rats, and are studied in the other mammals as a way to better understand these pathways in humans.

Marsupials, and in particular, tammar wallabies (Notamacropus eugenii) are especially useful for studying the processes of sexual differentiation and development in the context of androgen biosynthesis, because sexual differentiation in these species occurs only after birth, with testes beginning to form two days after birth and ovaries only on the eighth day after birth. This feature of post-natal early sexual differentiation allows scholars to study the influence of hormones on the body from the very beginning of the process of sexual differentiation, as well as the pathways of biosynthesis of these hormones. Tammar wallabies are particularly interesting due to the fact that all these hormones, pathways, and the ways in which hormones affect body features and growth of different organs can be studied when the organism is already born, unlike in other mammals such as rats, where sexual differentiation in a fetus occurs inside the placenta before birth.

The discovery of the backdoor pathway to DHT biosynthesis in tammar wallaby pouch young prompted research into identifying and characterizing similar pathways in humans, leading to a better understanding of the regulation, metabolism, and therapeutic targeting of androgen biosynthesis in human health and diseases related to excessive or insufficient androgen biosynthesis when the classical androgen pathway could not fully explain the observed conditions in patients. Over the following two decades, several other distinct pathways have been discovered: the pathways that lead to the synthesis of 11-oxygenated androgens.

Below is a brief selection of key events in the history of androgen backdoor pathway research:

- In 2000, Shaw et al. demonstrated that circulating 3α-diol mediates prostate development in tammar wallaby pouch young via conversion to DHT in target tissues. Tammar wallaby pouch young do not show sexually dimorphic circulating levels of T and DHT during prostate development which suggests that another androgenization mechanism was responsible. While 3α-diol's androgen receptor binding affinity is five orders of magnitude lower than DHT (3α-diol is nearly inactive at the androgen receptor), it was known that 3α-diol can be oxidized back to DHT via the action of a number of dehydrogenases.
- In 2003, Wilson et al. demonstrated that 5α-reductase expression in target tissues enabled a novel pathway from 17OHP to 3α-diol without T or A4 as an intermediate.
- In 2004, Mahendroo et al. demonstrated that an overlapping novel pathway is operating in mouse testes, generalizing what had been demonstrated in tammar wallaby.
- The term "backdoor pathway" was coined by Auchus in 2004 and was described as 5α-reduction of 17α-hydroxyprogesterone (17OHP) which is a first step in a pathway that ultimately leads to the production of dihydrotestosterone (DHT). and defined as a route to DHT that: (1) bypasses conventional intermediates androstenedione (A4) and T; (2) involves 5α-reduction of C_{21} pregnanes to C_{19} androstanes; and (3) involves the 3α-oxidation of 3α-diol to DHT. The backdoor pathway explains how androgens are produced under certain normal and pathological conditions in humans when the classical androgen pathway cannot fully explain the observed consequences.
- The clinical relevance of the results published by Auchus in 2004 was demonstrated in 2012 for the first time when Kamrath et al. attributed the urinary metabolites to the androgen backdoor pathway from 17OHP to DHT in patients with steroid 21-hydroxylase (encoded by the gene CYP21A2) enzyme deficiency.
- Barnard et al. in 2017 demonstrated metabolic pathways from C_{21} steroids to 11KDHT that bypasses A4 and T, an aspect that is similar to that of the backdoor pathway to DHT. These newly discovered pathways to 11-oxygenated androgens were also described as "backdoor" pathways due to this similarity, and were further characterized in subsequent studies.

== See also ==
- Congenital adrenal hyperplasia due to 21-hydroxylase deficiency
- Late onset congenital adrenal hyperplasia
