= Antley–Bixler syndrome =

Congenital disorder

- Other names: Trapezoidocephaly-synostosis syndrome,
- Antley–Bixler syndrome has an autosomal recessive pattern of inheritance.
- Specialty: Medical genetics

Antley–Bixler syndrome is a rare, severe autosomal recessive congenital disorder characterized by malformations and deformities affecting the majority of the skeleton and other areas of the body.

== Presentation ==
Antley–Bixler syndrome presents itself at birth or prenatally. Features of the disorder include brachycephaly (flat forehead), craniosynostosis (complete skull-joint closure) of both coronal and lambdoid sutures, facial hypoplasia (underdevelopment); bowed ulna (forearm bone) and femur (thigh bone), synostosis of the radius (forearm bone), humerus (upper arm bone) and trapezoid (hand bone); camptodactyly (fused interphalangeal joints in the fingers), thin ilial wings (outer pelvic plate) and renal malformations.

Other symptoms, such as cardiac malformations, proptotic exophthalmos (bulging eyes), arachnodactyly (spider-like fingers) as well as nasal, anal and vaginal atresia (occlusion) have been reported.

== Pathophysiology ==
There are two distinct genetic mutations associated with the Antley–Bixler syndrome phenotype, which suggests the disorder may be genetically heterogeneous.

OMIM	Gene	Description
207410	FGFR2	Mutations found in the FGFR2 gene have been shown to cause synostosis and other formal skeletal, polydactylic and syndactylic abnormalities found in Antley–Bixler and similar disorders.
201750	POR	A missense mutation in the cytochrome P450 reductase (POR) gene results in abnormal steroidogenesis related to the genital malformations often found in Antley–Bixler. In OMIM, this is classified as an "Antley–Bixler syndrome-like phenotype" and not as Antley–Bixler syndrome itself.

Antley–Bixler syndrome is inherited in an autosomal recessive pattern, which means the defective gene is located on an autosome, and two copies of the gene (one inherited from each parent) are required to be born with the disorder. The parents of an individual with an autosomal recessive disorder both carry one copy of the defective gene but are usually not affected by the disorder.

== Diagnosis ==
The diagnosis of Antley–Bixler syndrome is usually made after birth (postnatally) based upon a thorough clinical evaluation and characteristic physical findings. Other imaging procedures and genetic testing may also be conducted to diagnose the disorder.

In some children, a diagnosis of Antley–Bixler syndrome may be suggested before birth (prenatally) based upon tests such as ultrasound. Ultrasound allows us to generate an image of the developing fetus, which may then reveal characteristic findings that are associated with the disorder. If there is a known family history of the condition, targeted genetic testing is available for patient families.

== Treatment ==
The treatment of Antley–Bixler syndrome is directed toward the specific symptoms that are seen in each individual. Such treatment requires the coordinated efforts of a team of medical professionals who may need to systematically and comprehensively plan the treatment for a child with this condition. These professionals may include pediatricians, surgeons, physicians who specialize in disorders of specific body areas and organs. In individuals with Antley–Bixler syndrome, treatment typically includes surgery. The surgical procedures performed will depend upon the severity of the skeletal problems and its associated symptoms. It is possible that multiple surgeries will be needed in order to treat the malformations present.

There is no cure for the condition. All treatment is supportive and aimed at managing symptoms. However, early intervention may be important in ensuring that affected children reach their potential. For example, physical therapy is typically recommended to help improve the range of movement at certain joint contractures. Other therapies that may aide in managing symptoms include occupational therapy and speech therapy.

Because this is a genetic condition, individuals with Antley–Bixler syndrome and their families would benefit from meeting with a genetic counselor. Genetic counselors are professionals who have specialized education in genetics and counseling to provide personalized help patients may need as they make decisions about their genetic health.

== Eponym ==
Antley–Bixler syndrome is named after Ray M. Antley (1937–2014) and David Bixler (1929–2005), who first described the disorder in a journal report from 1975.

== See also ==
- Cytochrome P450 oxidoreductase deficiency
- Crouzon syndrome
- Jackson–Weiss syndrome
- Pfeiffer syndrome
