= Joseph Jez =

- Born: Fairbanks, Alaska
- Education: Pennsylvania State University; University of Pennsylvania
- Scientific career
- Fields: Structural Biology and Biochemistry
- Workplaces: Washington University in St. Louis
- Thesis: Steroid Recognition and Engineering of Catalysis in Mammalian Aldo-Keto Reductases
- Doctoral advisor: Trevor M. Penning
- Website: https://sites.wustl.edu/jezlab/

Joseph Jez is a Howard Hughes Medical Institute Professor and Spencer T. Olin Professor of Biology at Washington University in St. Louis. He served as the Chair of the Washington University Biology Department from 2018 to 2023. His research focuses on the effect of environmental changes on biochemical pathways in plants, aiming to apply this research to present-day agricultural and environmental issues.

== Education and career ==
Joseph Jez attended Pennsylvania State University in University Park, Pennsylvania for his undergraduate studies. At Pennsylvania State University, he obtained a B.S. in Biochemistry and a minor in English, graduating with honors in 1992. He later obtained a PhD in Biochemistry and Molecular Biophysics at the University of Pennsylvania in 1998. At the University of Pennsylvania, he conducted research under Professor Trevor M. Penning. His thesis was titled, "Steroid Recognition and Engineering of Catalysis in Mammalian Aldo-Keto Reductases." Jez was an NIH-NRSA postdoctoral research fellow with Professor Joseph Noel from 1998 to 2001 at The Salk Institute for Biological Studies in La Jolla, California, where he studied the structure, mechanisms, and engineering of plant polyketide biosynthesis.

He worked at Kosan Biosciences from 2001 to 2002, before moving to St. Louis. From 2002 to 2010, Jez was an Assistant Member and Principal Investigator at the Donald Danforth Plant Science Center in St. Louis, Missouri. In 2008, he became a faculty member in the Department of Biology at Washington University in St. Louis. Currently, Jez is a Spencer T. Olin Professor of Biology at Washington University in St. Louis. He was named a Howard Hughes Medical Institute Professor in 2014. At Washington University, he established the Biotech Explorers Pathway program, which is a two-year academic program for undergraduate students interested in the interconnections of science, business, technology, and engineering. He also teaches an upper-level biochemistry laboratory course for undergraduate students interested in conducting research at a more advanced level.

== Research focus ==
Jez currently conducts research on the effect of environmental changes on the biochemical pathway of plants with the aim to produce engineered systems that will address present-day agricultural and environmental problems. His laboratory uses x-ray crystallography, enzymology, molecular biology, proteomics, and plant biology. His research is centered around three general ideas: metabolic regulation and environmental responses in plants, enzymatic control of plant hormone responses, and the use of C. elegans to study new metabolic pathways in nematodes.

== Publications ==
- Google Scholar Citations
- Search Results for author Jez JM on PubMed.

=== Selected publications ===
- Powers, Samantha K.; Holehouse, Alex S.; Korasick, David A.; Schreiber, Katherine H.; Clark, Natalie M.; Jing, Hongwei; Emenecker, Ryan; Han, Soeun; Tycksen, Eric; Hwang, Ildoo; Sozzani, Rosangela; Jez, Joseph M.; Pappu, Rohit V.; Strader, Lucia C. (October 2019). "Nucleo-cytoplasmic Partitioning of ARF Proteins Controls Auxin Responses in Arabidopsis thaliana". Molecular Cell. 76 (1): 177–190.e5. doi:10.1016/j.molcel.2019.06.044. PMC 6778021. PMID 31421981.
- Kumar, Roshan; Lee, Soon Goo; Augustine, Rehna; Reichelt, Micheal; Vassão, Daniel G.; Palavalli, Manoj H.; Allen, Aron; Gershenzon, Jonathan; Jez, Joseph M.; Bisht, Naveen C. (July 2019). "Molecular Basis of the Evolution of Methylthioalkylmalate Synthase and the Diversity of Methionine-Derived Glucosinolates". The Plant Cell. 31 (7): 1633–1647. doi:10.1105/tpc.19.00046. PMC 6635866. PMID 31023839.
- Lee, Soon Goo; Salomon, Eitan; Yu, Oliver; Jez, Joseph M. (25 June 2019). "Molecular basis for branched steviol glucoside biosynthesis". Proceedings of the National Academy of Sciences. 116 (26): 13131–13136. Bibcode:2019PNAS..11613131L. doi:10.1073/pnas.1902104116. PMC 6600987. PMID 31182573.
  - Megha Satyanarayana (June 13, 2019). "This enzyme is what makes stevia so sweet". Chemical & Engineering News.
- Jez, Joseph M.; Lee, Soon Goo; Sherp, Ashley M. (16 September 2016). "The next green movement: Plant biology for the environment and sustainability". Science. 353 (6305): 1241–1244. Bibcode:2016Sci...353.1241J. doi:10.1126/science.aag1698. PMID 27634525. S2CID 206651005.
- Westfall, Corey S.; Zubieta, Chloe; Herrmann, Jonathan; Kapp, Ulrike; Nanao, Max H.; Jez, Joseph M. (29 June 2012). "Structural Basis for Prereceptor Modulation of Plant Hormones by GH3 Proteins". Science. 336 (6089): 1708–1711. Bibcode:2012Sci...336.1708W. doi:10.1126/science.1221863. PMID 22628555. S2CID 11679112.

== Awards and recognition ==
Awards and Fellowships

- American Association for Advancement of Science (Fellow, 2018)
- Howard Hughes Medical Institute Professor (2014)
- Fulbright Senior Specialist Fellowship (2012)
- National Key Laboratory of Crop Genetic Improvement, Huazhong Agricultural University (International Scholar, 2007–2013)
- Arthur C. Neish Young Investigator Award, Phytochemical Society of North America (2007)
- Presidential Early Career Award for Scientists & Engineers (PECASE) (2005)

Societies and Academies

- Faculty of 1000 - Plant Biochemistry & Physiology (2019–present)
- American Society of Plant Biologists Education Committee (2018–present)
- American Society of Plant Biologists SURF Program Committee (2011–2018)
- Plant Metabolic Engineering Gordon Research Conference (Co-chair, 2017)
- McDonnell International Scholars Academy, China Agricultural University (Ambassador, 2015–present)

Editor of Scientific Journals

- The Journal of Biological Chemistry (associate editor, 2016–present; editorial board, 2008–2016)
- Biochemical Journal (editorial board, 2013–present)
- Encyclopedia of Biological Chemistry, 3rd Edition, (editor-in-chief, 2018–2021)
- Emerging Topics in Life Sciences (guest editor, 2020–2021)
- Plant Cell Reports (guest editor, 2017–2018)
- Plant Science (guest editor, 2017–2018)
