= Dihydrochelirubine 12-monooxygenase =

Class of enzymes

dihydrochelirubine 12-monooxygenase

Identifiers
- EC no.: 1.14.14.101
- CAS no.: 158736-41-5

Databases
- IntEnz: IntEnz view
- BRENDA: BRENDA entry
- ExPASy: NiceZyme view
- KEGG: KEGG entry
- MetaCyc: metabolic pathway
- PRIAM: profile
- PDB structures: RCSB PDB PDBe PDBsum
- Gene Ontology: AmiGO / QuickGO
Search
- PMC: articles
- PubMed: articles
- NCBI: proteins

Dihydrochelirubine 12-monooxygenase (EC 1.14.14.101) is an enzyme that catalyzes the chemical reaction

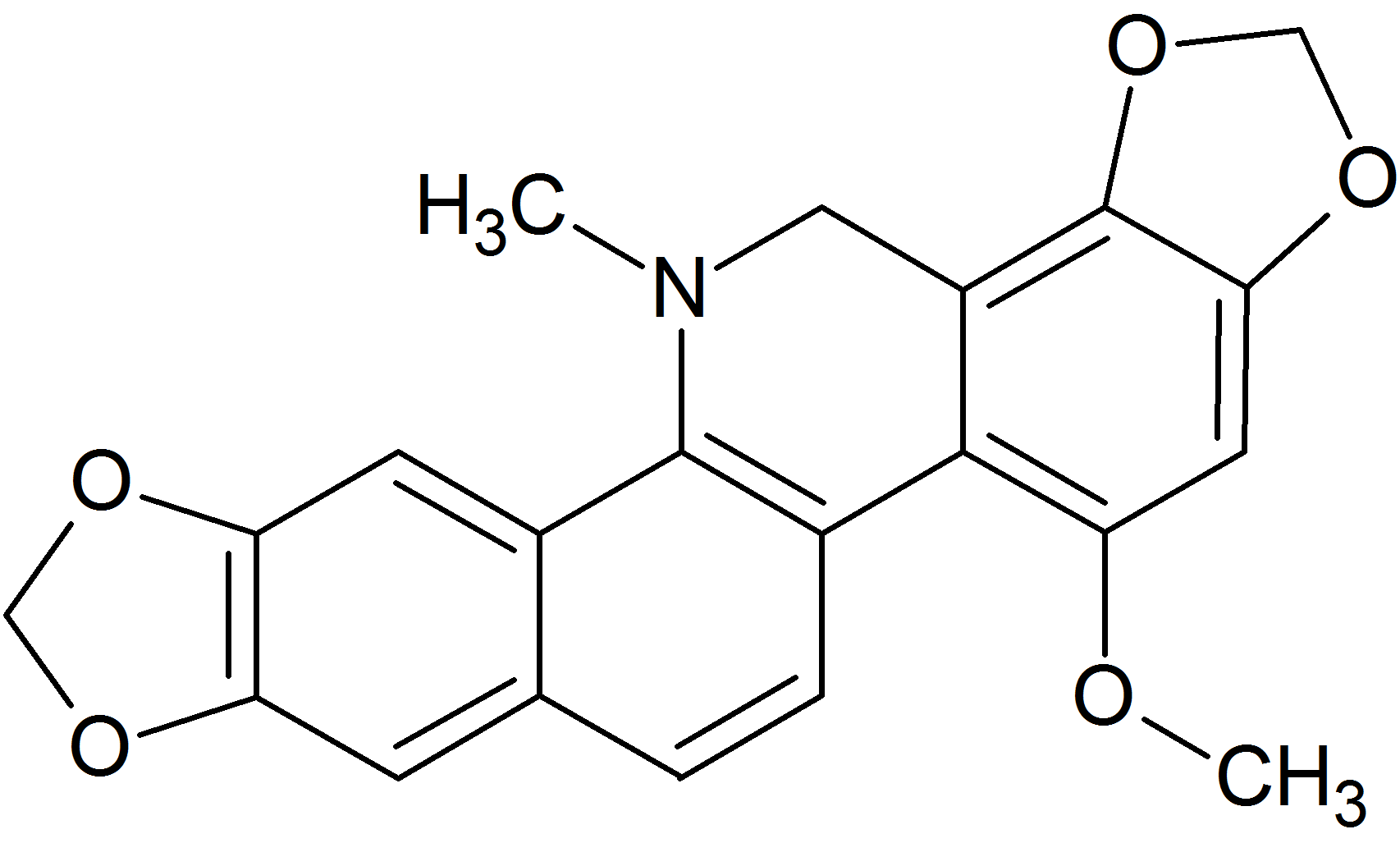
dihydrochelirubine
O_{2}
2 H_{2}O
12-hydroxydihydrochelirubine

Dihydrochelirubine 12-monooxygenase is a cytochrome P450 protein containing heme, isolated from Thalictrum bulgaricum. It requires a partner cytochrome P450 reductase for functional expression. This uses nicotinamide adenine dinucleotide phosphate. The systematic name of this enzyme class is dihydrochelirubine,NADPH:oxygen oxidoreductase (12-hydroxylating). This enzyme is also called dihydrochelirubine 12-hydroxylase. This enzyme participates in alkaloid biosynthesis.
