= 3alpha(17beta)-hydroxysteroid dehydrogenase (NAD+) =

Enzyme

3-alpha(17-beta)-hydroxysteroid dehydrogenase (NAD^{+})

Identifiers
- EC no.: 1.1.1.239
- CAS no.: 126469-82-7

Databases
- IntEnz: IntEnz view
- BRENDA: BRENDA entry
- ExPASy: NiceZyme view
- KEGG: KEGG entry
- MetaCyc: metabolic pathway
- PRIAM: profile
- PDB structures: RCSB PDB PDBe PDBsum
- Gene Ontology: AmiGO / QuickGO
Search
- PMC: articles
- PubMed: articles
- NCBI: proteins

In enzymology, a 3alpha(17beta)-hydroxysteroid dehydrogenase (NAD^{+}) (EC 1.1.1.239) is an enzyme that catalyzes the chemical reaction:

Testosterone
+ NAD^{+}
H^{+}
H^{+}
Androstenedione
+ NADH

The two substrates of this enzyme are testosterone and oxidised nicotinamide adenine dinucleotide (NAD^{+}). Its products are androstenedione, reduced NADH, and a proton.

This enzyme belongs to the family of oxidoreductases, specifically those acting on the CH-OH group of donor with NAD^{+} or NADP^{+} as acceptor. The systematic name of this enzyme class is 3alpha(or 17beta)-hydroxysteroid:NAD^{+} oxidoreductase. Other names in common use include 3alpha,17beta-hydroxy steroid dehydrogenase, 3alpha(17beta)-HSD, and 3alpha(17beta)-hydroxysteroid dehydrogenase (NAD^{+}). This enzyme participates in androgen and estrogen metabolism.

== See also ==
- 3α-Hydroxysteroid dehydrogenase
