= 20alpha-hydroxysteroid dehydrogenase =

Class of enzymes

20-α-hydroxysteroid dehydrogenase

Identifiers
- EC no.: 1.1.1.149
- CAS no.: 9040-08-8

Databases
- IntEnz: IntEnz view
- BRENDA: BRENDA entry
- ExPASy: NiceZyme view
- KEGG: KEGG entry
- MetaCyc: metabolic pathway
- PRIAM: profile
- PDB structures: RCSB PDB PDBe PDBsum
- Gene Ontology: AmiGO / QuickGO
Search
- PMC: articles
- PubMed: articles
- NCBI: proteins

In enzymology, 20-α-hydroxysteroid dehydrogenase (EC 1.1.1.149) is an enzyme that catalyzes the chemical reaction

17α,20α-dihydroxypregn-4-en-3-one
+ NADP^{+}
H^{+}
H^{+}
17α-hydroxyprogesterone
+ NADPH

The two substrates of this enzyme are 17α,20α-dihydroxypregn-4-en-3-one and oxidised nicotinamide adenine dinucleotide phosphate (NADP^{+}). Its products are 17α-hydroxyprogesterone, reduced NADPH, and a proton.

This enzyme belongs to the family of oxidoreductases, specifically those acting on the CH-OH group of donor with NAD^{+} or NADP^{+} as acceptor. The systematic name of this enzyme class is 20alpha-hydroxysteroid:NAD(P)^{+} 20-oxidoreductase. Other names in common use include 20alpha-hydroxy steroid dehydrogenase, 20alpha-hydroxy steroid dehydrogenase, 20alpha-HSD, and 20alpha-HSDH. This enzyme participates in c21-steroid hormone metabolism.

20alpha-HSD has been initially described as a progesterone metabolizing enzyme of the ovary. On a functional level, ovarian 20alpha-HSD is actively involved in the control of progesterone homeostasis in pregnancy of rats and mice. While 20alpha-HSD expression and activity is downregulated in the corpus luteum of pregnancy, 24 hrs prior to parturition ovarian 20alpha-HSD activity is acutely stimulated. Accordingly, in mice with targeted deletion of the 20alpha-HSD gene, progesterone blood concentration remain high throughout pregnancy which results in a delay of 2–4 days in parturition. Indicating that expression of 20alpha-HSD activity is mandatory for the induction of parturition through reduction of progesterone blood concentration. In mice, 20alpha-HSD is also expressed in the adrenals, kidneys, brain, thymus, T cells and bone marrow. Its induction in hematopoietic cells was used as an assay for the identification of T cell derived factor interleukin-3. In addition, the enzyme reduces and inactivates 17-deoxycorticosterone, the precursor of aldosterone and corticosterone.

== Structural studies ==
As of late 2007, 3 structures have been solved for this class of enzymes, with PDB accession codes 1MRQ (AKR1C1), 1Q13, and 1Q5M.

AKR1C1, AKR1C2, and AKR1C3

== Enzymes ==
AKR1C1 has high catalytic efficiency as a 20α-HSD and AKR1C2 and AKR1C3 efficiently catalyze this reaction as well.

== See also ==
- 3β(or 20α)-hydroxysteroid dehydrogenase
