= CYP26B1 =

Protein-coding gene in the species Homo sapiens

Identifiers
- Aliases: CYP26B1, CYP26A2, P450RAI-2, P450RAI2, RHFCA, cytochrome P450 family 26 subfamily B member 1
- External IDs: OMIM: 605207; MGI: 2176159; GeneCards: CYP26B1

Gene location (Human)
Chr.	Chromosome 2 (human)
Band	2p13.2	Start	72,129,238 bp
Band	2p13.2	End	72,147,862 bp

Gene location (Mouse)
Chr.	Chromosome 6 (mouse)
Band	6|6 C3	Start	84,548,396 bp
Band	6|6 C3	End	84,570,890 bp
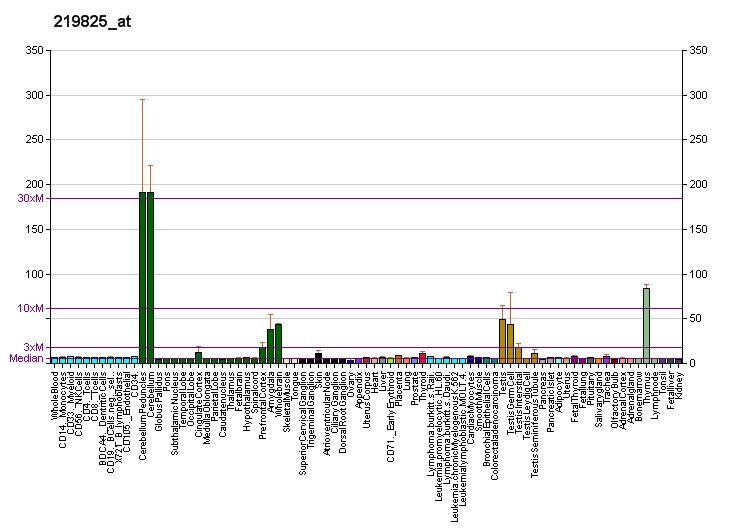
RNA expression pattern
Bgee	Human / Mouse (ortholog); Top expressed in: pons; skin of arm; cerebellar vermis; cerebellar hemisphere; right hemisphere of cerebellum; skin of leg; adipose tissue; subcutaneous adipose tissue; decidua; skin of abdomen / Top expressed in: hand; skin of external ear; otolith organ; utricle; endocardial cushion; lip; decidua; neuromere; rhombomere; foot; More reference expression data
BioGPS	More reference expression data
Gene ontology
Molecular function	iron ion binding; retinoic acid binding; metal ion binding; monooxygenase activity; heme binding; oxidoreductase activity, acting on paired donors, with incorporation or reduction of molecular oxygen; oxidoreductase activity; oxidoreductase activity, acting on paired donors, with incorporation or reduction of molecular oxygen, NAD(P)H as one donor, and incorporation of one atom of oxygen; retinoic acid 4-hydroxylase activity
Cellular component	cytoplasm; organelle membrane; endoplasmic reticulum membrane; membrane; intracellular membrane-bounded organelle; endoplasmic reticulum
Biological process	cellular response to retinoic acid; proximal/distal pattern formation; retinoic acid catabolic process; tongue morphogenesis; establishment of skin barrier; positive regulation of tongue muscle cell differentiation; regulation of retinoic acid receptor signaling pathway; negative regulation of retinoic acid receptor signaling pathway; male meiotic nuclear division; bone morphogenesis; positive regulation of gene expression; retinoic acid receptor signaling pathway; embryonic limb morphogenesis; vitamin metabolic process; spermatogenesis; establishment of T cell polarity; cornification; cell fate determination; inflammatory response; regulation of T cell differentiation; xenobiotic metabolic process; sterol metabolic process; response to retinoic acid; response to vitamin A; kidney development
Sources:Amigo / QuickGO
Orthologs
Databases	NCBI: entry; OMA: entry
Species	Human	Mouse
Entrez	56603	232174
Ensembl	ENSG00000003137	ENSMUSG00000063415
UniProt	Q9NR63	Q811W2
RefSeq (mRNA)	NM_001277742; NM_019885	NM_001177713; NM_175475
RefSeq (protein)	NP_001264671; NP_063938	NP_001171184; NP_780684
Location (UCSC)	Chr 2: 72.13 – 72.15 Mb	Chr 6: 84.55 – 84.57 Mb
PubMed search
- Wikidata
View/Edit Human	View/Edit Mouse

Cytochrome P450 26B1 is a protein that in humans is encoded by the CYP26B1 gene.

This gene encodes a member of the cytochrome P450 superfamily of enzymes. The cytochrome P450 proteins are monooxygenases that catalyze many reactions involved in drug metabolism and the synthesis of cholesterol, steroids and other lipids. The enzyme encoded by this gene is involved in the specific inactivation of all-trans-retinoic acid to hydroxylated forms, such as 4-oxo-, 4-OH-, and 18-OH-all-trans-retinoic acid.

In a developing mouse embryo, CYP26B1 is expressed in the distal tip of the forming limb bud with an abundance in the apical ectodermal ridge. In a knockout mouse model, mice manifest with severe limb malformations and die after birth due to respiratory distress. However, if the expression of CYP26B1 is conditionally deleted only prior to E9.5, the limbs are not as severely truncated and more digits are visible. Research suggests that this difference is attributable to the timing of chondroblast differentiation.

CYP26B1 has been shown to be over-expressed in colorectal cancer cells compared to normal colonic epithelium. CYP26B1 expression was also independently prognostic in patients with colorectal cancer and strong expression was associated with a poorer outcome.

In the mouse, it has been shown that retinoid-degrading enzyme coded for by the gene, CYP26B1, also plays a major role in male gonad development and spermatogenesis. The actions of retinoic acid(RA) are suppressed by CYP26B1 which halts male germ cell differentiation. RA is responsible for the activation of Stra8 which signals XX germ cells to progress to meiotic prophase I. The actions of Stra8 are inhibited by CYP26B1 until a male is of pubertal age. The mechanism by which CYP26B1 is downregulated in the testis has yet to be discovered.

In a genome-wide study, CCHCR1, TCN2, TNXB, LTA, FASN, and CYP26B1 were identified as loci associated with a risk for developing esophageal squamous cell carcinoma. Of these loci, CYP26B1 exhibited the highest effect size. Moreover, the CYP26B1 locus was found to have two alleles with differing capacities to catabolize all-trans retinoic acid, a chemotherapeutic agent. When the allele with the higher catabolic capacity, rs138478634-GA, was overexpressed, cell proliferation was significantly enhanced in comparison to the other allele, rs138478634-GG. Additionally, research is suggestive of a lifestyle interaction where individuals with the risk allele who partake in smoking or drinking present with an odd-ratio over 2-fold higher than smokers or drinkers without the variant or individuals who refrain.

== See also ==
- Cytochrome P450 oxidoreductase deficiency
