= AKR1B10 =

Protein-coding gene in the species Homo sapiens

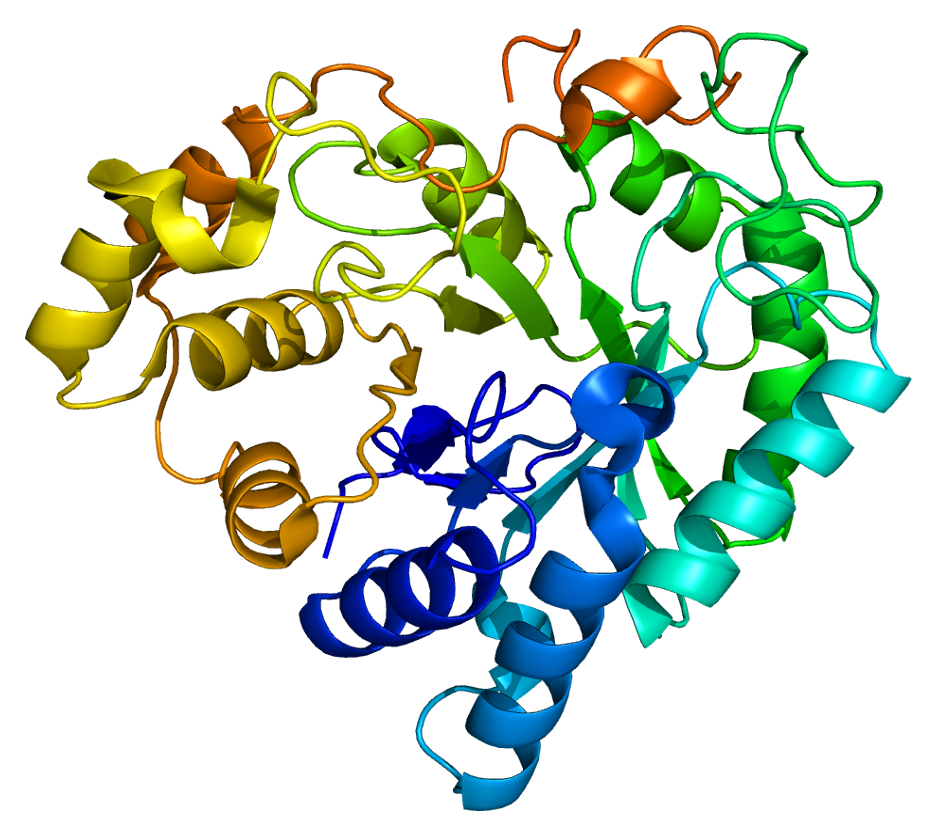

Identifiers
- Aliases: AKR1B10, AKR1B11, AKR1B12, ALDRLn, ARL-1, ARL1, HIS, HSI, aldo-keto reductase family 1, member B10 (aldose reductase), aldo-keto reductase family 1 member B10
- External IDs: OMIM: 604707; MGI: 107673; GeneCards: AKR1B10
Available structures
PDB	Ortholog search: PDBe RCSB
PDB	List of PDB id codes 1ZUA, 4GA8, 4GAB, 4GQ0, 4GQG, 4I5X, 4ICC, 4JIH, 4JII, 4WEV, 4XZL, 4XZN, 4XZM
Enzyme activity
EC #	BRENDA	ExPASy	KEGG	MetaCyc
1.1.1.54	↗	↗	↗	↗
1.1.1.300	↗	↗	↗	↗

Gene location (Human)
Chr.	Chromosome 7 (human)
Band	7q33	Start	134,527,567 bp
Band	7q33	End	134,541,412 bp

Gene location (Mouse)
Chr.	Chromosome 6 (mouse)
Band	6 B1|6 14.91 cM	Start	34,331,054 bp
Band	6 B1|6 14.91 cM	End	34,345,398 bp
RNA expression pattern
Bgee	Human / Mouse (ortholog); Top expressed in: jejunal mucosa; mucosa of ileum; gums; gingival epithelium; mucosa of transverse colon; gallbladder; pancreatic ductal cell; gastric mucosa; islet of Langerhans; mucosa of sigmoid colon / Top expressed in: pyloric antrum; mucous cell of stomach; adrenal gland; Scarpa's ganglion; epithelium of stomach; blastocyst; endothelial cell of lymphatic vessel; Gonadal ridge; stroma of bone marrow; duodenum; More reference expression data
BioGPS	n/a
Gene ontology
Molecular function	retinal dehydrogenase activity; geranylgeranyl reductase activity; indanol dehydrogenase activity; aldo-keto reductase (NADP) activity; protein binding; oxidoreductase activity; alditol:NADP+ 1-oxidoreductase activity; alcohol dehydrogenase (NADP+) activity; NADP-retinol dehydrogenase activity; allyl-alcohol dehydrogenase activity
Cellular component	cytosol; extracellular region; lysosome; mitochondrion
Biological process	daunorubicin metabolic process; doxorubicin metabolic process; retinoid metabolic process; farnesol catabolic process; retinol metabolic process; cellular detoxification of aldehyde
Sources:Amigo / QuickGO
Orthologs
Databases	NCBI: entry; OMA: entry
Species	Human	Mouse
Entrez	57016	14187
Ensembl	ENSG00000198074	ENSMUSG00000029762
UniProt	O60218	P45377
RefSeq (mRNA)	NM_020299	NM_008012
RefSeq (protein)	NP_064695	NP_032038
Location (UCSC)	Chr 7: 134.53 – 134.54 Mb	Chr 6: 34.33 – 34.35 Mb
PubMed search
- Wikidata
View/Edit Human	View/Edit Mouse

Aldo-keto reductase family 1 member B10 is an enzyme that in humans is encoded by the AKR1B10 gene.

This gene encodes a member of the aldo/keto reductase superfamily, which consists of more than 40 known enzymes and proteins. This member can efficiently reduce aliphatic and aromatic aldehydes, and it is less active on hexoses. It is highly expressed in adrenal gland, small intestine, and colon, and may play an important role in liver carcinogenesis.
