= AKR1C4 =

Protein-coding gene in the species Homo sapiens

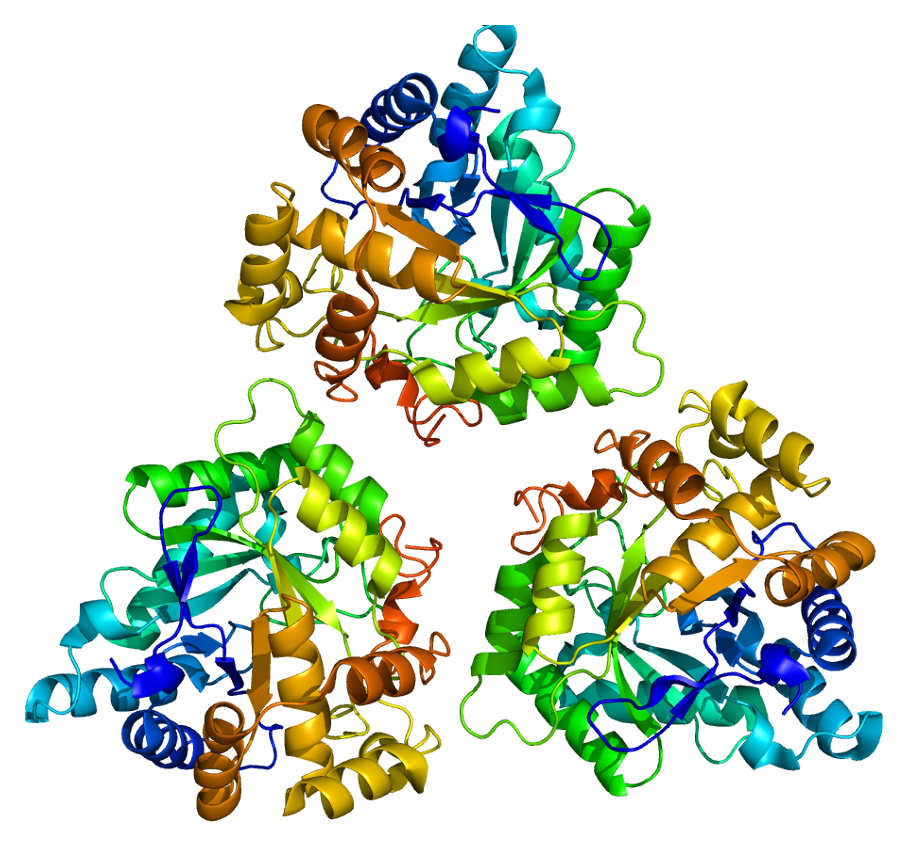

Identifiers
- Aliases: AKR1C4, 3-alpha-HSD, C11, CDR, CHDR, DD-4, DD4, HAKRA, aldo-keto reductase family 1, member C4, aldo-keto reductase family 1 member C4
- External IDs: OMIM: 600451; MGI: 1933427; GeneCards: AKR1C4
Available structures
PDB	Ortholog search: PDBe RCSB
PDB	List of PDB id codes 2FVL
Enzyme activity
EC #	BRENDA	ExPASy	KEGG	MetaCyc
1.1.1.51	↗	↗	↗	↗
1.1.1.53	↗	↗	↗	↗
1.1.1.62	↗	↗	↗	↗
1.1.1.209	↗	↗	↗	↗
1.1.1.210	↗	↗	↗	↗
1.1.1.225	↗	↗	↗	↗
1.1.1.357	↗	↗	↗	↗

Gene location (Human)
Chr.	Chromosome 10 (human)
Band	10p15.1	Start	5,195,462 bp
Band	10p15.1	End	5,218,949 bp

Gene location (Mouse)
Chr.	Chromosome 13 (mouse)
Band	13 A1|13 2.48 cM	Start	4,484,305 bp
Band	13 A1|13 2.48 cM	End	4,507,876 bp
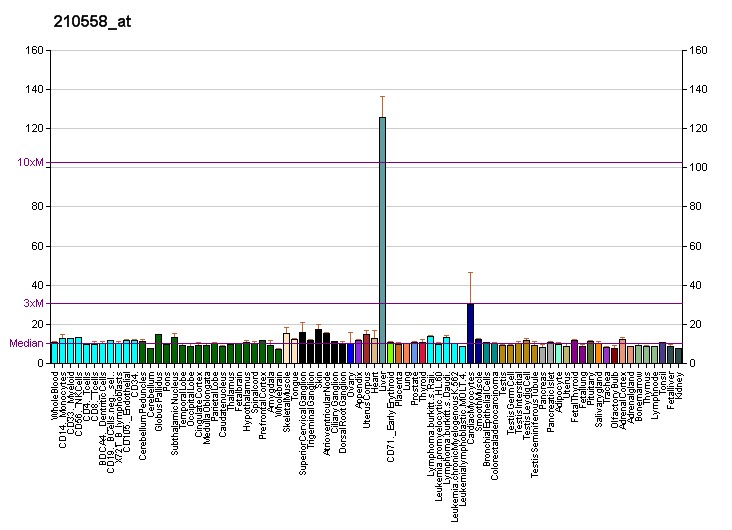

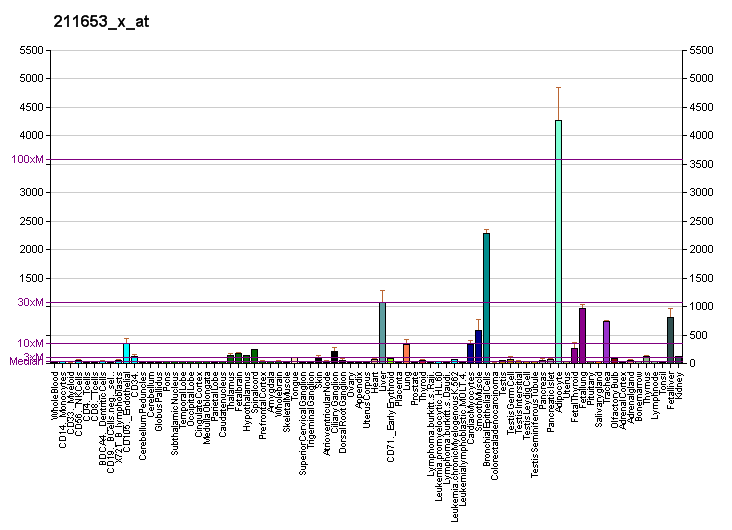
RNA expression pattern
Bgee	Human / Mouse (ortholog); Top expressed in: right lobe of liver; gallbladder; testicle; islet of Langerhans; duodenum; jejunal mucosa; gonad; granulocyte; Achilles tendon; muscle of thigh / Top expressed in: left lobe of liver; gallbladder; bronchus; urethra; lobar bronchus; Lumen of fundus of stomach; abdominal aorta; vasculature of trunk; proximal convoluted tubule; sexually immature organism; More reference expression data
BioGPS	More reference expression data
Gene ontology
Molecular function	retinal dehydrogenase activity; aldo-keto reductase (NADP) activity; bile acid transmembrane transporter activity; oxidoreductase activity, acting on NAD(P)H, quinone or similar compound as acceptor; chlordecone reductase activity; electron transfer activity; oxidoreductase activity; androsterone dehydrogenase activity; alditol:NADP+ 1-oxidoreductase activity; alcohol dehydrogenase (NADP+) activity; steroid dehydrogenase activity; ketosteroid monooxygenase activity
Cellular component	cytoplasm; cytosol; extracellular exosome
Biological process	cellular response to jasmonic acid stimulus; steroid metabolic process; daunorubicin metabolic process; doxorubicin metabolic process; androgen metabolic process; retinoid metabolic process; bile acid and bile salt transport; bile acid biosynthetic process; electron transport chain; prostaglandin metabolic process; progesterone metabolic process
Sources:Amigo / QuickGO
Orthologs
Databases	NCBI: entry; OMA: entry
Species	Human	Mouse
Entrez	1109	83702
Ensembl	ENSG00000198610	ENSMUSG00000021210
UniProt	P17516	P70694
RefSeq (mRNA)	NM_001818	NM_030611
RefSeq (protein)	NP_001809	NP_085114
Location (UCSC)	Chr 10: 5.2 – 5.22 Mb	Chr 13: 4.48 – 4.51 Mb
PubMed search
- Wikidata
View/Edit Human	View/Edit Mouse

Aldo-keto reductase family 1 member C4, also known as 3α-Hydroxysteroid dehydrogenase type 1 (3α-HSD1), is an enzyme that in humans is encoded by the AKR1C4 gene. It is known to be necessary for the synthesis of the endogenous neurosteroids allopregnanolone, tetrahydrodeoxycorticosterone, and 3α-androstanediol. It is also known to catalyze the reversible conversion of 3α-androstanediol (5α-androstane-3α,17β-diol) to dihydrotestosterone (DHT, 5α-androstan-17β-ol-3-one) and vice versa.

== Function ==
This gene encodes a member of the aldo/keto reductase superfamily, which consists of more than 40 known enzymes and proteins. These enzymes catalyze the conversion of aldehydes and ketones to their corresponding alcohols by utilizing NADH and/or NADPH as cofactors. The enzymes display overlapping but distinct substrate specificity. This enzyme catalyzes the bioreduction of chlordecone, a toxic organochlorine pesticide, to chlordecone alcohol in liver. This gene shares high sequence identity with three other gene members and is clustered with those three genes at 10p15-p14 on chromosome 10.

== Clinical significance ==
Various antidepressants, including the SSRIs fluoxetine, fluvoxamine, sertraline, and paroxetine, the SNRI venlafaxine, and mirtazapine, have been found to activate certain isoforms of the 3α-hydroxysteroid dehydrogenase, resulting in a selective facilitation of 5α-dihydroprogesterone conversion into allopregnanolone. This action has been implicated in their effectiveness in affective disorders, and has resulted in them being described as selective brain steroidogenic stimulants (SBSSs).

AKR1C4 plays an important role in the androgen backdoor pathway, a hormone producing pathway that is necessary for male sexual development. Unlike with AKR1C2, mutations in the AKR1C4 gene alone do not appear to be enough to lead to differences of sexual development, but they seem to enough to make the effects of a separate AKR1C2 mutation (46,XY sex reversal 8) more severe.

== Isozymes ==
HGNC Gene Symbol	Enzyme Name Aliases
AKR1C1	aldo-keto reductase family 1 member C1; 20α-hydroxysteroid dehydrogenase
AKR1C2	aldo-keto reductase family 1 member C2; 3α-hydroxysteroid dehydrogenase type 3
AKR1C3	aldo-keto reductase family 1 member C3; 3α-hydroxysteroid dehydrogenase type 2; 17β-hydroxysteroid dehydrogenase type 5; HSD17B5
AKR1C4	aldo-keto reductase family 1 member C4; 3α-hydroxysteroid dehydrogenase type 1

== See also ==
- Steroidogenic enzyme
- 3α-Hydroxysteroid dehydrogenase
- 3β-hydroxysteroid dehydrogenase
