= 3beta(or 20alpha)-hydroxysteroid dehydrogenase =

Enzyme

3β(or 20α)-hydroxysteroid dehydrogenase

Identifiers
- EC no.: 1.1.1.210
- CAS no.: 82869-26-9

Databases
- IntEnz: IntEnz view
- BRENDA: BRENDA entry
- ExPASy: NiceZyme view
- KEGG: KEGG entry
- MetaCyc: metabolic pathway
- PRIAM: profile
- PDB structures: RCSB PDB PDBe PDBsum
- Gene Ontology: AmiGO / QuickGO
Search
- PMC: articles
- PubMed: articles
- NCBI: proteins

In enzymology, a 3-β(or 20-α)-hydroxysteroid dehydrogenase (EC 1.1.1.210) is an enzyme that catalyzes the chemical reaction

5α-androstan-3β,17β-diol + NADP^{+} $\rightleftharpoons$ 17β-hydroxy-5α-androstan-3-one + NADPH + H^{+}

This enzyme possesses the combined activities of the 3-β-hydroxysteroid dehydrogenase/Δ-5-4 isomerase and 20-α-hydroxysteroid dehydrogenase enzymes.
