= Cytochrome P450 oxidoreductase deficiency =

- Other names: PORD
- Specialty: Endocrinology

Cytochrome P450 oxidoreductase deficiency (PORD) is a rare disease and inborn error of metabolism caused by deficiency of cytochrome P450 oxidoreductase (POR). POR is a 2-flavin protein that is responsible for the transfer of electrons from NADPH to all 50 microsomal cytochrome P450 (CYP450) enzymes. This includes the steroidogenic enzymes CYP17A1 (17α-hydroxylase/17,20-lyase), CYP19A1 (aromatase), and CYP21A2 (21-hydroxylase); CYP26B1 (metabolizes retinoic acid); and the hepatic drug-metabolizing CYP450 enzymes (e.g., CYP3A4), among many other CYP450 enzymes. Virilization of female infants in PORD may also be caused by alternative biosynthesis of 5α-dihydrotestosterone via the so-called "androgen backdoor pathway". The ABS component of severe forms of PORD is probably caused by CYP26B1 deficiency, which results in retinoic acid excess and defects during skeletal embryogenesis. All forms of PORD in humans are likely partial, as POR knockout in mice results in death during prenatal development.

== Symptoms and signs ==
Symptoms of severe forms of PORD include ambiguous genitalia in males and females, congenital adrenal hyperplasia, cortisol deficiency, and Antley–Bixler skeletal malformation syndrome (ABS), while symptoms of mild forms include polyendocrine metabolic ovarian syndrome (PMOS) in women and hypogonadism in men. Maternal virilization also occurs in severe forms, due to aromatase deficiency in the placenta.

== See also ==
- Androgen backdoor pathway
- Cytochrome P450 reductase
