= 3α-Hydroxysteroid dehydrogenase =

Enzyme

Identifiers
- EC no.: 1.1.1.50

Databases
- BRENDA: enzyme data
- ExPASy: NiceZyme view
- KEGG: enzyme entry
- MetaCyc: metabolic pathway
- Rhea: reactions
- PDB structures: RCSB PDB PDBe PDBsum
Search
- PMC: articles
- PubMed: articles
- NCBI: proteins

3α-Hydroxysteroid dehydrogenase (3α-HSD) is an enzyme (1.1.1.50) that plays a role in the metabolism of steroids and non-steroidal compounds in humans and other species, such as bacteria, fungi, plants, and so on. This enzyme catalyzes the chemical reaction of conversion of 3-ketosteroids into 3α-hydroxysteroids. The enzyme has various protein isoforms (isozymes).

== 3α-Hydroxysteroid dehydrogenase in humans ==
In humans, 3α-hydroxysteroid dehydrogenase is encoded by the multiple different genes, so that each gene encodes a particular isoform. The most studied isoforms are type 1 (AKR1C4), type 2 (AKR1C3) and type 3 (AKR1C2). Each of these isoforms shares higher than 70% sequence homology and common properties. They are monomeric soluble proteins consisting of about 320 amino acid residues with molecular weights about 34±37 kilodaltons; although these isoforms are highly similar in their sequence, they exhibit unique reactivity profiles.

Albeit other isoforms may also exists in humans; still, RNA expression analysis indicates that human type 1 isozyme (AKR1C4) is expressed exclusively in the liver, whereas type 3 (AKR1C2) is more widely expressed and is found, besides the liver, also in the adrenal glads, testis, brain, prostate, and HaCaT keratinocytes.

The 3α-hydroxysteroid dehydrogenase activity has also been detected in retinol dehydrogenases found in microsomal fractions of rat and human tissues, the membrane-bound proteins which are members of the short-chain dehydrogenase/reductase family. The 3α-hydroxysteroid dehydrogenase activities of these retinol dehydrogenases enzymes are almost exclusively oxidative in intact mammalian cells and are nicotinamide adenine dinucleotide (NAD)±specific. NAD is a coenzyme found in all living cells and is required for the metabolic processes that make life possible; specifically, NAD is involved in redox reactions, carrying electrons from one reaction to another; the coenzyme exists in two forms: NAD+ (oxidized form) and NADH (reduced form), so that NAD plays a role in the production of energy through the electron transport chain, as well as in the synthesis of nucleic acids. In context of 3α-hydroxysteroid dehydrogenase enzymes, the notion that these enzymes are NAD±specific mean that they require NAD in either its oxidized or reduced form to function properly; still, the activity of these enzymes is almost exclusively oxidative in intact mammalian cells, relying on NAD as a coenzyme for their action, whereas in other (non-mammalian) organisms it can be in reduced form.

In humans, the genes for the protein isoforms of the 3α-hydroxysteroid dehydrogenase enzyme share a common gene structure that is characteristic of the aldo-keto-reductase family members and contain at least nine conserved exon-intron boundaries.

HGNC Gene Symbol	Enzyme Name Aliases
AKR1C1	aldo-keto reductase family 1 member C1; 20α-hydroxysteroid dehydrogenase
AKR1C2	aldo-keto reductase family 1 member C2; 3α-hydroxysteroid dehydrogenase type 3
AKR1C3	aldo-keto reductase family 1 member C3; 3α-hydroxysteroid dehydrogenase type 2; 17β-hydroxysteroid dehydrogenase type 5; HSD17B5
AKR1C4	aldo-keto reductase family 1 member C4; 3α-hydroxysteroid dehydrogenase type 1

Regardless of a particular isoform, the 3α-hydroxysteroid dehydrogenase enzyme in humans is known to be necessary for the synthesis of many important endogenous neurosteroids, such as allopregnanolone, tetrahydrodeoxycorticosterone, and 5α-androstane-3α,17β-diol, also known as 3α-androstanediol, and abbreviated as 3α-diol. The activity of this enzyme towards 3α-diol is important in both the conventional pathways of androgen biosynthesis and the androgen backdoor pathway. An important enzyme activity in humans is the transformation of one of the most potent natural androgens, 5α-dihydrotestosterone into 3α-diol, a compound having much lower biological activity towards the androgen receptor. This enzyme in humans, in its various protein isoforms, are also known to be involved in the metabolism of glucocorticoids, progestins, prostaglandins, bile acid precursors, and xenobiotics, thus playing a role in the control of a series of active steroid levels in target tissues.

== 3α-Hydroxysteroid dehydrogenase in other species ==
The carbon atom numbering in a hypothetical steroid nucleus can be demonstrated by a structure of 24-ethyl-lanostane, a prototypical steroid with 32 carbon atoms. Its core ring system (ABCD), composed of 17 carbon atoms, is shown with IUPAC-approved ring lettering and carbon atom numbering.

In non-human species, 3α-hydroxysteroid dehydrogenases contribute to steroidogenesis as part of the NADPH/NAD±dependent oxidoreductase family; so that these enzymes enable the conversion between ketones and their corresponding secondary alcohols across various positions on steroidal substrates (3α-, 3β-, 11β-, 17β-, 20α-, and 20β-positions of the stroid nucleus), and also play a dual role in both the synthesis and deactivation of steroids, and some also participate in the metabolism of a range of non-steroidal molecules. Within target tissues, these dehydrogenases transform inactive steroid hormones into their active counterparts and vice versa, so that these reactions regulates the activation of steroid hormone receptors and influences non-genomic signaling pathways; as such,3α-hydroxysteroid dehydrogenases are regulators, enabling the pre-receptor modulation of steroid hormone activities in these organisms.
