= HSD17B6 =

Identifiers
- Aliases: HSD17B6, HSE, RODH, SDR9C6, hydroxysteroid (17-beta) dehydrogenase 6, hydroxysteroid 17-beta dehydrogenase 6
- External IDs: OMIM: 606623; MGI: 1351670; GeneCards: HSD17B6
Enzyme activity
EC #	BRENDA	ExPASy	KEGG	MetaCyc
1.1.1.53	↗	↗	↗	↗
1.1.1.62	↗	↗	↗	↗
1.1.1.105	↗	↗	↗	↗
1.1.1.209	↗	↗	↗	↗
1.1.1.239	↗	↗	↗	↗

Gene location (Human)
Chr.	Chromosome 12 (human)
Band	12q13.3	Start	56,752,161 bp
Band	12q13.3	End	56,787,790 bp

Gene location (Mouse)
Chr.	Chromosome 10 (mouse)
Band	10|10 D3	Start	127,826,805 bp
Band	10|10 D3	End	127,843,480 bp
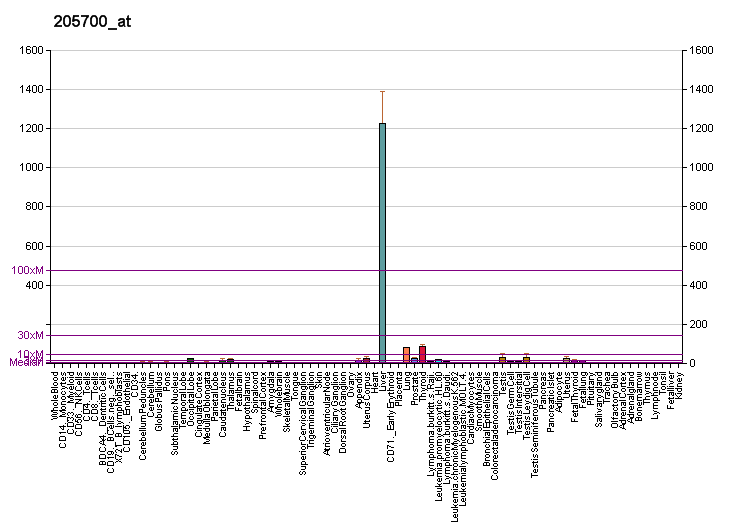

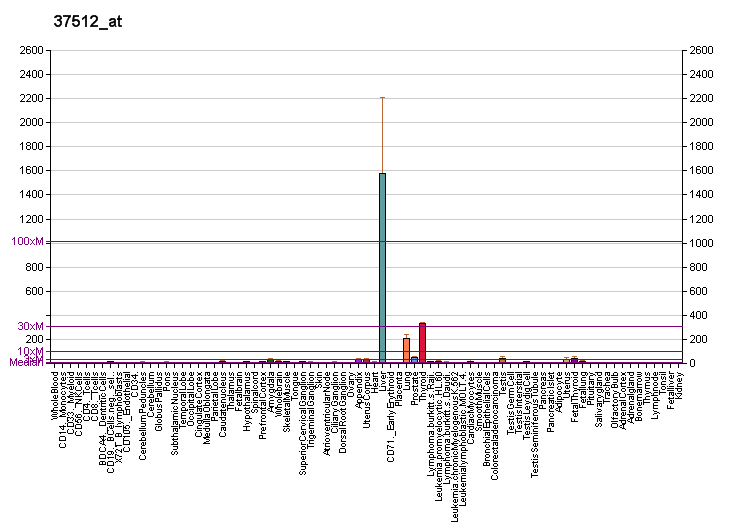
RNA expression pattern
Bgee	Human / Mouse (ortholog); Top expressed in: right lobe of liver; lower lobe of lung; seminal vesicula; parietal pleura; spleen; canal of the cervix; saphenous vein; caudate nucleus; nucleus accumbens; prostate / Top expressed in: left lobe of liver; duodenum; olfactory epithelium; jejunum; morula; intestinal villus; pyloric antrum; blastocyst; epithelium of stomach; mucous cell of stomach; More reference expression data
BioGPS	More reference expression data
Gene ontology
Molecular function	electron transfer activity; oxidoreductase activity; estradiol 17-beta-dehydrogenase activity; catalytic activity; testosterone dehydrogenase (NAD+) activity; NAD-retinol dehydrogenase activity
Cellular component	organelle membrane; endosome; early endosome membrane; intracellular anatomical structure; endoplasmic reticulum; membrane; intracellular membrane-bounded organelle
Biological process	androgen biosynthetic process; androgen catabolic process; steroid metabolic process; lipid metabolism; electron transport chain
Sources:Amigo / QuickGO
Orthologs
Databases	NCBI: entry; OMA: entry
Species	Human	Mouse
Entrez	8630	27400
Ensembl	ENSG00000025423	ENSMUSG00000025396
UniProt	O14756	Q9R092
RefSeq (mRNA)	NM_003725	NM_013786; NM_001359377
RefSeq (protein)	NP_003716	NP_038814; NP_001346306
Location (UCSC)	Chr 12: 56.75 – 56.79 Mb	Chr 10: 127.83 – 127.84 Mb
PubMed search
- Wikidata
View/Edit Human	View/Edit Mouse

Hydroxysteroid 17-beta dehydrogenase 6 is an enzyme that in humans is encoded by the HSD17B6 gene.

The protein encoded by this gene has both oxidoreductase and epimerase activities and is involved in androgen catabolism. The oxidoreductase activity can convert 3 alpha-adiol to dihydrotestosterone, while the epimerase activity can convert androsterone to epi-androsterone. Both reactions use NAD+ as the preferred cofactor. This gene is a member of the retinol dehydrogenase family. Transcript variants utilizing alternative polyadenylation signals exist.
