= AKR1C2 =

Protein-coding gene in the species Homo sapiens

Identifiers
- Aliases: AKR1C2, AKR1C-pseudo, BABP, DD, DD2, DDH2, HAKRD, HBAB, MCDR2, SRXY8, TDD, DD-2, DD/BABP, aldo-keto reductase family 1, member C2, aldo-keto reductase family 1 member C2
- External IDs: OMIM: 600450; MGI: 1924587; GeneCards: AKR1C2
Available structures
PDB	Ortholog search: PDBe RCSB
PDB	List of PDB id codes 1IHI, 1J96, 1XJB, 2HDJ, 2IPJ, 4JQ1, 4JQ2, 4JQ3, 4JQ4, 4JQA, 4JTQ, 4JTR, 4L1W, 4L1X, 4XO6, 4XO7
Enzyme activity
EC #	BRENDA	ExPASy	KEGG	MetaCyc
1.1.1.51	↗	↗	↗	↗
1.1.1.62	↗	↗	↗	↗
1.1.1.112	↗	↗	↗	↗
1.1.1.209	↗	↗	↗	↗
1.1.1.357	↗	↗	↗	↗
1.3.1.20	↗	↗	↗	↗

Gene location (Human)
Chr.	Chromosome 10 (human)
Band	10p15.1	Start	4,987,775 bp
Band	10p15.1	End	5,018,031 bp

Gene location (Mouse)
Chr.	Chromosome 13 (mouse)
Band	13|13 A1	Start	4,624,074 bp
Band	13|13 A1	End	4,636,540 bp
RNA expression pattern
Bgee	Human / Mouse (ortholog); Top expressed in: islet of Langerhans; right lobe of liver; olfactory zone of nasal mucosa; gallbladder; gastrocnemius muscle; Descending thoracic aorta; ascending aorta; muscle of thigh; left coronary artery; minor salivary glands / Top expressed in: right kidney; human kidney; proximal tubule; morula; embryo; primary oocyte; primary visual cortex; secondary oocyte; blastocyst; muscle of thigh; More reference expression data
BioGPS	n/a
Gene ontology
Molecular function	trans-1,2-dihydrobenzene-1,2-diol dehydrogenase activity; alditol:NADP+ 1-oxidoreductase activity; phenanthrene 9,10-monooxygenase activity; oxidoreductase activity, acting on NAD(P)H, quinone or similar compound as acceptor; bile acid binding; carboxylic acid binding; oxidoreductase activity; ketosteroid monooxygenase activity; alcohol dehydrogenase (NADP+) activity; steroid dehydrogenase activity
Cellular component	cytoplasm; cytosol
Biological process	prostaglandin metabolic process; G protein-coupled receptor signaling pathway; cellular response to jasmonic acid stimulus; steroid metabolic process; positive regulation of protein kinase B signaling; epithelial cell differentiation; daunorubicin metabolic process; doxorubicin metabolic process; lipid metabolism; progesterone metabolic process; digestion; cellular response to prostaglandin D stimulus; positive regulation of cell population proliferation
Sources:Amigo / QuickGO
Orthologs
Databases	NCBI: entry; OMA: entry
Species	Human	Mouse
Entrez	1646	77337
Ensembl	ENSG00000151632	ENSMUSG00000021207
UniProt	P52895	Q91WR5
RefSeq (mRNA)	NM_001135241; NM_001354; NM_205845; NM_001321027; NM_001393392	NM_029901
RefSeq (protein)	NP_001128713; NP_001307956; NP_001345; NP_995317	NP_084177
Location (UCSC)	Chr 10: 4.99 – 5.02 Mb	Chr 13: 4.62 – 4.64 Mb
PubMed search
- Wikidata
View/Edit Human	View/Edit Mouse

Aldo-keto reductase family 1 member C2, is an enzyme that in humans is encoded by the AKR1C2 gene. This enzyme can catalyze many different kinds of reactions, but it is particularly important in the androgen backdoor pathway which is necessary for male sex determination. In fact, certain mutations in AKR1C2 are the cause of 46,XY Sex Reversal 8, a difference of sexual development (DSD) where a person with XY sex chromosomes is born with more typically female characteristics. This enzyme has also been known as bile acid binding protein, 3α-hydroxysteroid dehydrogenase type 3 (3α-HSD3), and dihydrodiol dehydrogenase type 2.

== Superfamily of enzymes ==
This gene encodes a member of the aldo/keto reductase superfamily, which consists of more than 40 known enzymes and proteins. These enzymes catalyze the conversion of aldehydes and ketones to their corresponding alcohols using NADH and/or NADPH as cofactors. The enzymes display overlapping but distinct substrate specificity. This particular enzyme, AKR1C2, binds bile acid with high affinity, and shows minimal 3α-hydroxysteroid dehydrogenase activity. The AKR1C2 gene shares high sequence identity with three other gene members and is clustered with those three genes at chromosome 10p15-p14. Three transcript variants encoding two different isoforms have been found for this gene. The AKR1C2 enzyme catalyzes reactions at specific positions on the steroid nucleus. Specifically, AKR enzymes, including AKR1C2, act as 3α/β-HSDs, 17β-HSDs, and 20α-HSDs, catalyzing NAD(P)(H)-dependent oxidoreduction of substituents at the C3, C17, and C20 positions of the steroid nucleus.

== Aldo-keto reductase activity ==
AKR1C2 binds bile acid with high affinity catalyzing aldo-keto reduction reaction.

Aldo-keto reductases, including AKR1C2, are NAD(P)H-linked oxidoreductases that primarily catalyze the reduction of aldehydes and ketones to primary and secondary alcohols. This reduction is dependent on NADPH.

In the context of bile acids, the AKR1C2 enzyme would bind to the bile acid (a type of steroid molecule) and catalyze the reduction of a carbonyl group (C=O) present in the bile acid to a hydroxy group (-OH), using NADPH as a cofactor. This reaction is part of the broader metabolic processes that these enzymes are involved in, which include biosynthesis, intermediary metabolism, and detoxification.

== 3α-hydroxysteroid dehydrogenase activity ==
The AKR1C2 enzyme is also known as 3α-hydroxysteroid dehydrogenase type 3 (3α-HSD3), meaning that the enzyme possesses 3α-hydroxysteroid dehydrogenase activity, i.e. it can hydroxylate steroids at a carbon position 3α of the steroid nucleus, attaching the hydroxy group (-OH) to carbon 3 in α stereiodirection. 3α-hydroxysteroid dehydrogenases, including AKR1C2, are NAD(P)H-linked oxidoreductases that primarily catalyze the oxidation of 3α-hydroxysteroids to their corresponding 3-ketosteroids. This oxidation is dependent on NAD+. The substrates for the 3α-HSD3 enzyme are steroids such as androgens, estrogens, and progestins, which regulate various sex functions. For example, 3α-HSD3 can catalyze the conversion of the potent androgen 5α-dihydrotestosterone (DHT) into its much less active form, 5α-androstan-3α,17β-diol (3α-diol), effectively deactivating biological action of DHT.

== Isozymes ==
HGNC Gene Symbol	Enzyme Name Aliases
AKR1C1	aldo-keto reductase family 1 member C1; 20α-hydroxysteroid dehydrogenase
AKR1C2	aldo-keto reductase family 1 member C2; 3α-hydroxysteroid dehydrogenase type 3
AKR1C3	aldo-keto reductase family 1 member C3; 3α-hydroxysteroid dehydrogenase type 2; 17β-hydroxysteroid dehydrogenase type 5; HSD17B5
AKR1C4	aldo-keto reductase family 1 member C4; 3α-hydroxysteroid dehydrogenase type 1
