= RDH16 =

Protein-coding gene in humans

Identifiers
- Aliases: RDH16, RODH-4, SDR9C8, retinol dehydrogenase 16 (all-trans), retinol dehydrogenase 16, hRDH-E
- External IDs: MGI: 2678390; GeneCards: RDH16
Enzyme activity
EC #	BRENDA	ExPASy	KEGG	MetaCyc
1.1.1.53	↗	↗	↗	↗
1.1.1.105	↗	↗	↗	↗
1.1.1.209	↗	↗	↗	↗
1.1.1.315	↗	↗	↗	↗

Gene location (Human)
Chr.	Chromosome 12 (human)
Band	12q13.3	Start	56,951,431 bp
Band	12q13.3	End	56,959,374 bp

Gene location (Mouse)
Chr.	Chromosome 10 (mouse)
Band	10 D3|10 76.27 cM	Start	127,685,797 bp
Band	10 D3|10 76.27 cM	End	127,697,045 bp
RNA expression pattern
Bgee	Human / Mouse (ortholog); Top expressed in: right lobe of liver; granulocyte; skin of leg; skin of abdomen; spleen; prostate; ectocervix; striated muscle tissue; skeletal muscle tissue; vagina / Top expressed in: renal cortex; liver; colon; human kidney; right kidney; More reference expression data
BioGPS	n/a
Gene ontology
Molecular function	electron transfer activity; oxidoreductase activity; NAD-retinol dehydrogenase activity; androstan-3-alpha,17-beta-diol dehydrogenase activity; protein homodimerization activity; androsterone dehydrogenase activity
Cellular component	integral component of membrane; organelle membrane; endoplasmic reticulum membrane; intracellular membrane-bounded organelle; endoplasmic reticulum; membrane
Biological process	lipid metabolism; electron transport chain; steroid metabolic process; retinol metabolic process
Sources:Amigo / QuickGO
Orthologs
Databases	NCBI: entry; OMA: entry
Species	Human	Mouse
Entrez	8608	216453
Ensembl	ENSG00000139547	ENSMUSG00000054052
UniProt	O75452	G5E8H9
RefSeq (mRNA)	NM_003708; NM_001320108	NM_147222
RefSeq (protein)	NP_001307037; NP_003699	NP_671755
Location (UCSC)	Chr 12: 56.95 – 56.96 Mb	Chr 10: 127.69 – 127.7 Mb
PubMed search
- Wikidata
View/Edit Human	View/Edit Mouse

Retinol dehydrogenase 16 (all-trans) is an enzyme that in humans is encoded by the RDH16 gene. The gene is also known as RODH-4 and SDR9C8. This enzyme oxidizes various types of retinol (all-trans-, 9-cis-, 11-cis-, 13-cis-) to their corresponding type of retinal.
