= Cytochrome P450 reductase =

Mammalian protein found in humans

POR
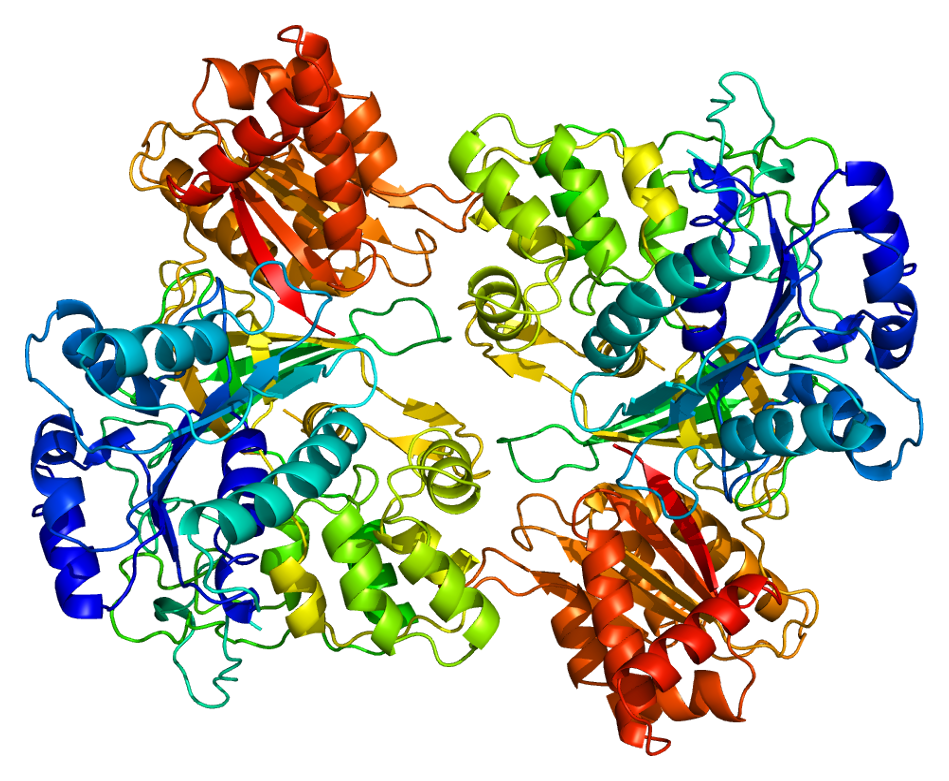
Available structures
PDB	Ortholog search: PDBe RCSB
PDB	List of PDB id codes 1B1C, 3FJO, 3QE2, 3QFC, 3QFR, 3QFS, 3QFT

Identifiers
- Aliases: POR, CPR, CYP450R, cytochrome p450 oxidoreductase, P450 oxidoreductase
- External IDs: OMIM: 124015; MGI: 97744; HomoloGene: 725; GeneCards: POR; OMA:POR - orthologs

Gene location (Human)
Chr.	Chromosome 7 (human)
Band	7q11.23	Start	75,899,200 bp
Band	7q11.23	End	75,986,855 bp

Gene location (Mouse)
Chr.	Chromosome 5 (mouse)
Band	5 G2|5 75.34 cM	Start	135,698,887 bp
Band	5 G2|5 75.34 cM	End	135,764,180 bp
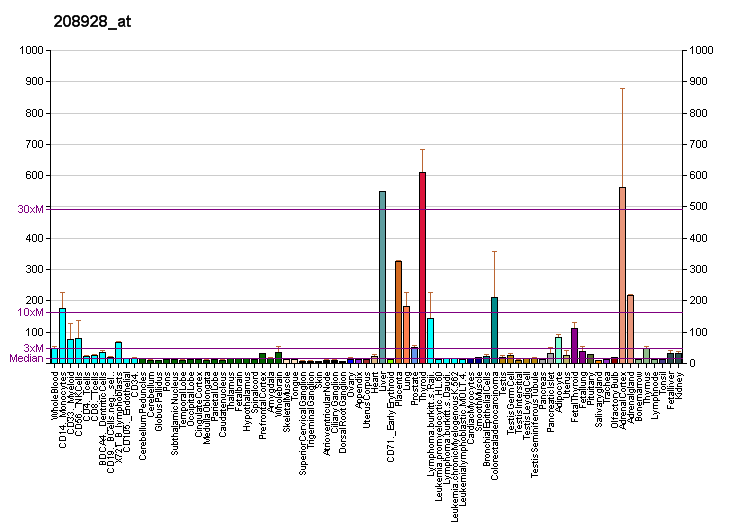
RNA expression pattern
Bgee	Human / Mouse (ortholog); Top expressed in: right lobe of liver; right adrenal gland; right adrenal cortex; left adrenal cortex; right lobe of thyroid gland; left lobe of thyroid gland; anterior pituitary; olfactory zone of nasal mucosa; right uterine tube; mucosa of transverse colon / Top expressed in: nasal epithelium; olfactory epithelium; granulocyte; right kidney; lacrimal gland; right lung; right lung lobe; superior surface of tongue; esophagus; brown adipose tissue; More reference expression data
BioGPS	More reference expression data
Gene ontology
Molecular function	FMN binding; NADPH-hemoprotein reductase activity; flavin adenine dinucleotide binding; cytochrome-b5 reductase activity, acting on NAD(P)H; protein binding; NADP binding; electron transfer activity; enzyme binding; oxidoreductase activity; iron-cytochrome-c reductase activity; hydrolase activity; nitric oxide dioxygenase activity
Cellular component	integral component of membrane; membrane; intracellular membrane-bounded organelle; mitochondrion; endoplasmic reticulum; endoplasmic reticulum membrane; cytoplasm; cytosol
Biological process	regulation of growth plate cartilage chondrocyte proliferation; nitrate catabolic process; negative regulation of cysteine-type endopeptidase activity involved in apoptotic process; cellular response to follicle-stimulating hormone stimulus; positive regulation of smoothened signaling pathway; response to nutrient; demethylation; nitric oxide catabolic process; negative regulation of apoptotic process; positive regulation of monooxygenase activity; negative regulation of lipase activity; internal peptidyl-lysine acetylation; regulation of cholesterol metabolic process; cellular response to peptide hormone stimulus; fatty acid oxidation; positive regulation of chondrocyte differentiation; cellular organofluorine metabolic process; flavonoid metabolic process; positive regulation of cholesterol biosynthetic process; positive regulation of steroid hormone biosynthetic process; cellular response to gonadotropin stimulus; carnitine metabolic process; xenobiotic metabolic process; electron transport chain; response to hormone
Sources:Amigo / QuickGO
Orthologs
Species	Human	Mouse
Entrez	5447	18984
Ensembl	ENSG00000127948	ENSMUSG00000005514
UniProt	P16435	P37040
RefSeq (mRNA)	NM_000941; NM_001367562	NM_008898
RefSeq (protein)	NP_000932; NP_001354491; NP_001369584; NP_001369586; NP_001369587 NP_001369588; NP_001369591	NP_032924
Location (UCSC)	Chr 7: 75.9 – 75.99 Mb	Chr 5: 135.7 – 135.76 Mb
PubMed search
- Wikidata
View/Edit Human	View/Edit Mouse

Cytochrome P450 reductase (also known as NADPH:ferrihemoprotein oxidoreductase, NADPH:hemoprotein oxidoreductase, NADPH:P450 oxidoreductase, P450 reductase, POR, CPR, CYPOR) is a membrane-bound enzyme required for electron transfer from NADPH to cytochrome P450 and other heme proteins including heme oxygenase in the endoplasmic reticulum of the eukaryotic cell.

== Gene ==
Human POR gene has 16 exons and the exons 2-16 code for a 677-amino acid POR protein (NCBI NP_000932.2). There is a single copy of 50 kb POR gene (NCBI NM_000941.2) in humans on chromosome 7 (7q11.23).

Paralogs of POR include nitric oxide synthase (EC 1.14.13.39), NADPH:sulfite reductase (EC 1.8.1.2), and methionine synthase reductase (EC 1.16.1.8).

== Protein structure ==
The 3D crystal structure of human POR has been determined. The molecule is composed of four structural domains: the FMN-binding domain, the connecting domain, the FAD-binding domain, and NADPH-binding domain. The FMN-binding domain is similar to the structure of FMN-containing protein flavodoxin, whereas the FAD-binding domain and NADPH-binding domains are similar to those of flavoprotein ferredoxin-NADP^{+} reductase (FNR). The connecting domain is situated between the flavodoxin-like and FNR-like domains. Conformation flexibility of POR is a key requirement for interaction with different redox partners like Cytochrome P450 proteins, and biasing the conformation of POR with small molecule ligands may be a way to control interaction with partner proteins and influence metabolism.

== Function ==
In Bacillus megaterium and Bacillus subtilis, POR is a C-terminal domain of CYP102, a single-polypeptide self-sufficient soluble P450 system (P450 is an N-terminal domain). The general scheme of electron flow in the POR/P450 system is:

NADPH → FAD → FMN → P450 → O_{2}

The definitive evidence for the requirement of POR in cytochrome-P450-mediated reactions came from the work of Lu, Junk and Coon, who dissected the P450-containing mixed function oxidase system into three constituent components: POR, cytochrome P450, and lipids.

Since all microsomal P450 enzymes require POR for catalysis, it is expected that disruption of POR would have devastating consequences. POR knockout mice are embryonic lethal, probably due to lack of electron transport to extrahepatic P450 enzymes since liver-specific knockout of POR yields phenotypically and reproductively normal mice that accumulate hepatic lipids and have remarkably diminished capacity of hepatic drug metabolism.

The reduction of cytochrome P450 is not the only physiological function of POR. The final step of heme oxidation by mammalian heme oxygenase requires POR and O_{2}. In yeast, POR affects the ferrireductase activity, probably transferring electrons to the flavocytochrome ferric reductase.

== Clinical significance ==
More than 200 variations in POR gene have been identified.

Five missense mutations (A287P, R457H, V492E, C569Y, and V608F) and a splicing mutation in the POR genes have been found in patients who had hormonal evidence for combined deficiencies of two steroidogenic cytochrome P450 enzymes - P450c17 CYP17A1, which catalyzes steroid 17α-hydroxylation and 17,20 lyase reaction, and P450c21 21-hydroxylase, which catalyzes steroid 21-hydroxylation. Another POR missense mutation Y181D has also been identified. Fifteen of nineteen patients having abnormal genitalia and disordered steroidogenesis were homozygous or apparent compound heterozygous for POR mutations that destroyed or dramatically inhibited POR activity.

=== POR Deficiency – Mixed Oxidase Disease ===
POR deficiency is the newest form of congenital adrenal hyperplasia first described in 2004. The index patient was a newborn 46,XX Japanese girl with craniosynostosis, hypertelorism, mid-face hypoplasia, radiohumeral synostosis, arachnodactyly and disordered steroidogenesis. However, the clinical and biochemical characteristics of patients with POR deficiency are long known in the literature as so-called mixed oxidase disease, as POR deficiency typically shows a steroid profile that suggests combined deficiencies of steroid 21-hydroxylase and 17α-hydroxylase/17,20 lyase activities. The clinical spectrum of POR deficiency ranges from severely affected children with ambiguous genitalia, adrenal insufficiency, and the Antley-Bixler skeletal malformation syndrome (ABS) to mildly affected individuals with polycystic ovary syndrome-like features. Some of the POR patients were born to mothers who became virilized during pregnancy, suggesting deficient placental aromatization of fetal androgens due to a lesion in microsomal aromatase resulting in low estrogen production, which was later confirmed by lower aromatase activities caused by POR mutations. However, it has also been suggested that fetal and maternal virilization in POR deficiency might be caused by increased dihydrotestosterone synthesis by the fetal gonad through an alternative "backdoor pathway" first described in the marsupials and later confirmed in humans. Gas chromatography/mass spectrometry analysis of urinary steroids from pregnant women carrying a POR-deficient fetus described in an earlier report also supports the existence of this pathway, and the relevance of the backdoor pathway along with POR dependent steroidogenesis have become clearer from recent studies. The role of POR mutations beyond CAH are being investigated; and questions such as how POR mutations cause bony abnormalities and what role POR variants play in drug metabolism by hepatic P450s are being addressed in recent publications. However, reports of ABS in some offspring of mothers who were treated with fluconazole, an antifungal agent which interferes with cholesterol biosynthesis at the level of CYP51 activity - indicate that disordered drug metabolism may result from deficient POR activity.

=== Williams syndrome ===
Williams syndrome is a genetic disorder characterized by the deletion of genetic material approximately 1.2 Mb from the POR gene (POR). Cells with this genetic deletion show reduced transcription of POR, it seems, due to the loss of a cis-regulatory element that alters expression of this gene. Some persons with Williams syndrome show characteristics of POR deficiency, including radioulnar synostosis and other skeletal abnormalities. Cases of mild impairment of cortisol and androgen synthesis have been noted, however, despite the fact that deficient POR impairs androgen synthesis, patients with Williams syndrome often show increased androgen levels. A similar increase in testosterone has been observed in a mouse model that has globally decreased POR expression.

== See also ==
- Androgen backdoor pathway
- P450-containing systems
