= AKR1C3 =

Protein-coding gene in the species Homo sapiens

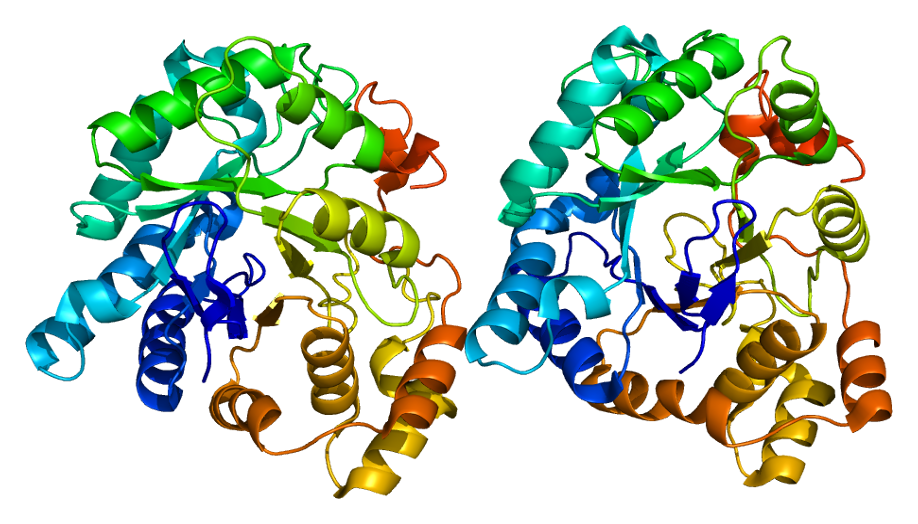

Identifiers
- Aliases: AKR1C3, DD3, DDX, HA1753, HAKRB, HAKRe, HSD17B5, PGFS, hluPGFS, aldo-keto reductase family 1, member C3, aldo-keto reductase family 1 member C3
- External IDs: OMIM: 603966; MGI: 2145420; GeneCards: AKR1C3
Available structures
PDB	Ortholog search: PDBe RCSB
PDB	List of PDB id codes 1RY0, 1RY8, 1S1P, 1S1R, 1S2A, 1S2C, 1XF0, 1ZQ5, 2F38, 2FGB, 3R43, 3R58, 3R6I, 3R7M, 3R8G, 3R8H, 3R94, 3UFY, 3UG8, 3UGR, 3UWE, 4DBS, 4DBU, 4DBW, 4DZ5, 4FA3, 4FAL, 4FAM, 4H7C, 4HMN, 4WDT, 4WDU, 4WDW, 4WDX, 4WRH, 4XVD, 4XVE, 4ZFC, 4YVX, 4YVV
Enzyme activity
EC #	BRENDA	ExPASy	KEGG	MetaCyc
1.1.1.53	↗	↗	↗	↗
1.1.1.62	↗	↗	↗	↗
1.1.1.64	↗	↗	↗	↗
1.1.1.188	↗	↗	↗	↗
1.1.1.210	↗	↗	↗	↗
1.1.1.239	↗	↗	↗	↗
1.1.1.357	↗	↗	↗	↗
1.3.1.20	↗	↗	↗	↗

Gene location (Human)
Chr.	Chromosome 10 (human)
Band	10p15.1	Start	5,035,354 bp
Band	10p15.1	End	5,107,686 bp

Gene location (Mouse)
Chr.	Chromosome 13 (mouse)
Band	13|13 A1	Start	4,182,614 bp
Band	13|13 A1	End	4,200,653 bp
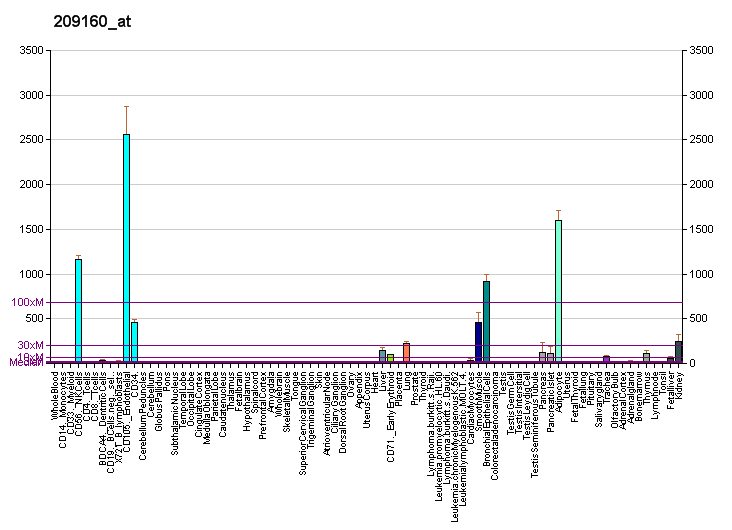

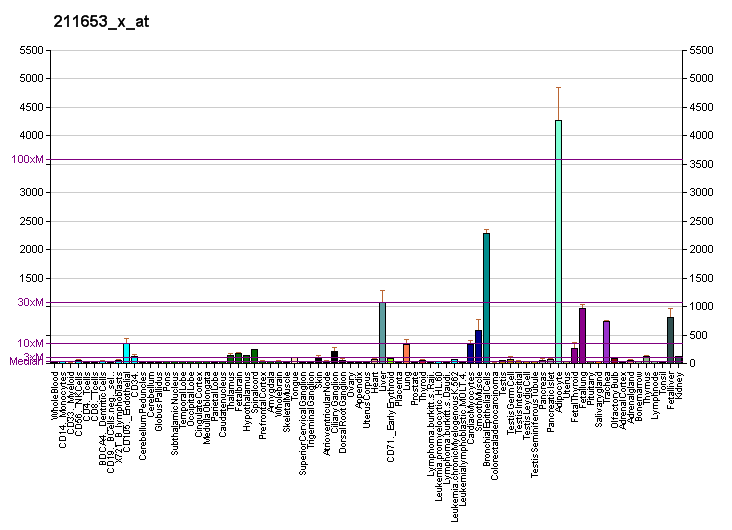
RNA expression pattern
Bgee	Human / Mouse (ortholog); Top expressed in: jejunal mucosa; pancreatic ductal cell; gallbladder; duodenum; mucosa of ileum; right lobe of liver; kidney tubule; islet of Langerhans; mucosa of transverse colon; skin of hip / Top expressed in: skin of external ear; lacrimal gland; right kidney; lip; conjunctival fornix; parotid gland; proximal tubule; gastrula; human kidney; decidua; More reference expression data
BioGPS	More reference expression data
Gene ontology
Molecular function	delta4-3-oxosteroid 5beta-reductase activity; prostaglandin-F synthase activity; trans-1,2-dihydrobenzene-1,2-diol dehydrogenase activity; alditol:NADP+ 1-oxidoreductase activity; retinal dehydrogenase activity; geranylgeranyl reductase activity; indanol dehydrogenase activity; aldo-keto reductase (NADP) activity; dihydrotestosterone 17-beta-dehydrogenase activity; phenanthrene 9,10-monooxygenase activity; ketoreductase activity; oxidoreductase activity, acting on NAD(P)H, quinone or similar compound as acceptor; testosterone dehydrogenase (NAD+) activity; NAD-retinol dehydrogenase activity; testosterone 17-beta-dehydrogenase (NADP+) activity; oxidoreductase activity; androsterone dehydrogenase activity; 15-hydroxyprostaglandin-D dehydrogenase (NADP+) activity; ketosteroid monooxygenase activity; NADP-retinol dehydrogenase activity; prostaglandin D2 11-ketoreductase activity; prostaglandin H2 endoperoxidase reductase activity; alcohol dehydrogenase (NADP+) activity; steroid dehydrogenase activity
Cellular component	cytoplasm; cytosol; intracellular anatomical structure; extracellular exosome; nucleus
Biological process	cellular response to calcium ion; negative regulation of retinoic acid biosynthetic process; prostaglandin metabolic process; G protein-coupled receptor signaling pathway; cellular response to jasmonic acid stimulus; steroid metabolic process; positive regulation of protein kinase B signaling; male gonad development; positive regulation of cell death; daunorubicin metabolic process; doxorubicin metabolic process; response to nutrient; regulation of retinoic acid receptor signaling pathway; progesterone metabolic process; cellular response to starvation; regulation of testosterone biosynthetic process; cellular response to cadmium ion; cellular response to corticosteroid stimulus; cyclooxygenase pathway; keratinocyte differentiation; retinal metabolic process; retinoid metabolic process; cellular response to reactive oxygen species; farnesol catabolic process; positive regulation of endothelial cell apoptotic process; positive regulation of reactive oxygen species metabolic process; cellular response to prostaglandin D stimulus; positive regulation of cell population proliferation; renal absorption; testosterone biosynthetic process; cellular response to prostaglandin stimulus; retinol metabolic process; macromolecule metabolic process
Sources:Amigo / QuickGO
Orthologs
Databases	NCBI: entry; OMA: entry
Species	Human	Mouse
Entrez	8644	105349
Ensembl	ENSG00000196139	ENSMUSG00000021214
UniProt	P42330	Q8K023
RefSeq (mRNA)	NM_003739; NM_001253908; NM_001253909; NM_016253	NM_134066; NM_001346535
RefSeq (protein)	NP_001240837; NP_001240838; NP_003730	NP_001333464; NP_598827
Location (UCSC)	Chr 10: 5.04 – 5.11 Mb	Chr 13: 4.18 – 4.2 Mb
PubMed search
- Wikidata
View/Edit Human	View/Edit Mouse

Aldo-keto reductase family 1 member C3 (AKR1C3), also known as 17β-hydroxysteroid dehydrogenase type 5 (17β-HSD5, HSD17B5) or 3α-hydroxysteroid dehydrogenase type 2 (3α-HSD2) is a steroidogenic enzyme that in humans is encoded by the AKR1C3 gene.

== Function ==
This gene encodes a member of the aldo/keto reductase superfamily, which consists of more than 40 known enzymes and proteins. These enzymes catalyze the conversion of aldehydes and ketones to their corresponding alcohols by utilizing NADH and/or NADPH as cofactors. The enzymes display overlapping but distinct substrate specificity. This enzyme catalyzes the reduction of prostaglandin D_{2}, prostaglandin H_{2}, and phenanthrenequinone, and the oxidation of prostaglandin F_{2α} to prostaglandin D_{2}. It is also capable of metabolizing estrogen and progesterone.

AKR1C3 may play an important role in the development of allergic diseases such as asthma, and may also have a role in controlling cell growth and/or differentiation. This gene shares high sequence identity with three other gene members and is clustered with those three genes at chromosome 10p15-p14.

== Pathology ==
AKR1C3 is overexpressed in prostate cancer (PCa) and is associated with the development of castration-resistant prostate cancer (CRPC). In addition, AKR1C3 overexpression may be a promising biomarker for prostate cancer progression.

== Isozymes of aldo-keto reductase family 1 member C ==
HGNC Gene Symbol	Enzyme Name Aliases
AKR1C1	aldo-keto reductase family 1 member C1; 20α-hydroxysteroid dehydrogenase
AKR1C2	aldo-keto reductase family 1 member C2; 3α-hydroxysteroid dehydrogenase type 3
AKR1C3	aldo-keto reductase family 1 member C3; 3α-hydroxysteroid dehydrogenase type 2; 17β-hydroxysteroid dehydrogenase type 5; HSD17B5
AKR1C4	aldo-keto reductase family 1 member C4; 3α-hydroxysteroid dehydrogenase type 1

== See also ==
- 3α-Hydroxysteroid dehydrogenase
