= AKR1C1 =

Protein-coding gene in the species Homo sapiens

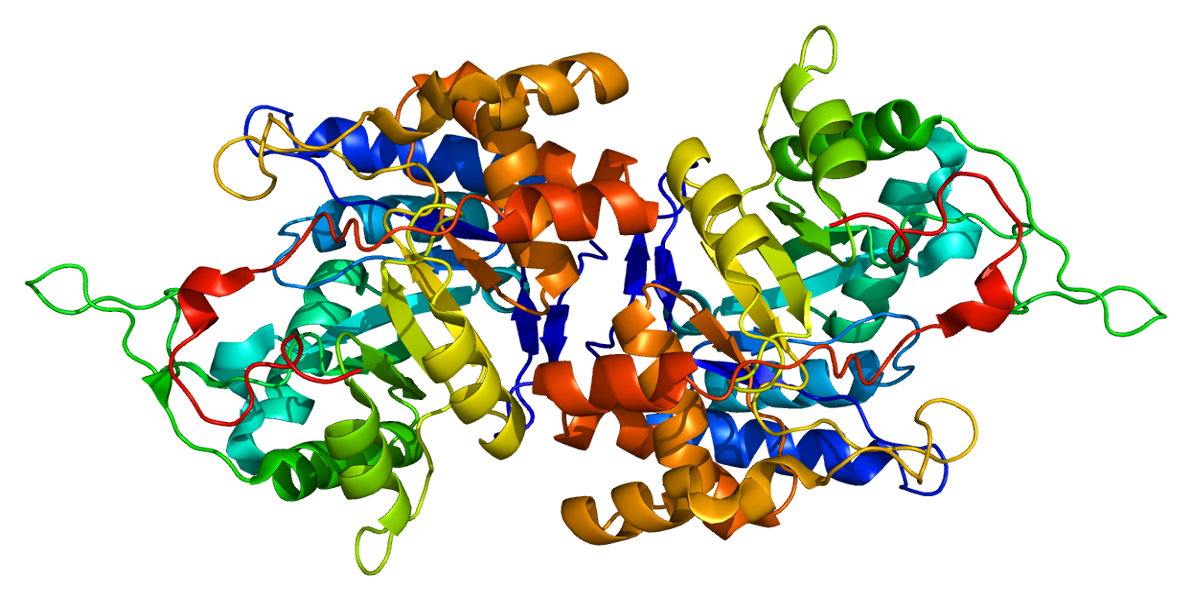

Identifiers
- Aliases: AKR1C1, 2-ALPHA-HSD, 20-ALPHA-HSD, C9, DD1, DD1/DD2, DDH, DDH1, H-37, HAKRC, HBAB, MBAB, aldo-keto reductase family 1, member C1, aldo-keto reductase family 1 member C1
- External IDs: OMIM: 600449; MGI: 1924587; GeneCards: AKR1C1
Available structures
PDB	Ortholog search: PDBe RCSB
PDB	List of PDB id codes 1MRQ, 3C3U, 3GUG, 3NTY, 4YVP
Enzyme activity
EC #	BRENDA	ExPASy	KEGG	MetaCyc
1.1.1.51	↗	↗	↗	↗
1.1.1.53	↗	↗	↗	↗
1.1.1.62	↗	↗	↗	↗
1.1.1.112	↗	↗	↗	↗
1.1.1.149	↗	↗	↗	↗
1.1.1.209	↗	↗	↗	↗
1.1.1.210	↗	↗	↗	↗
1.1.1.270	↗	↗	↗	↗
1.1.1.357	↗	↗	↗	↗
1.3.1.20	↗	↗	↗	↗

Gene location (Human)
Chr.	Chromosome 10 (human)
Band	10p15.1	Start	4,963,253 bp
Band	10p15.1	End	4,983,283 bp

Gene location (Mouse)
Chr.	Chromosome 13 (mouse)
Band	13|13 A1	Start	4,624,074 bp
Band	13|13 A1	End	4,636,540 bp
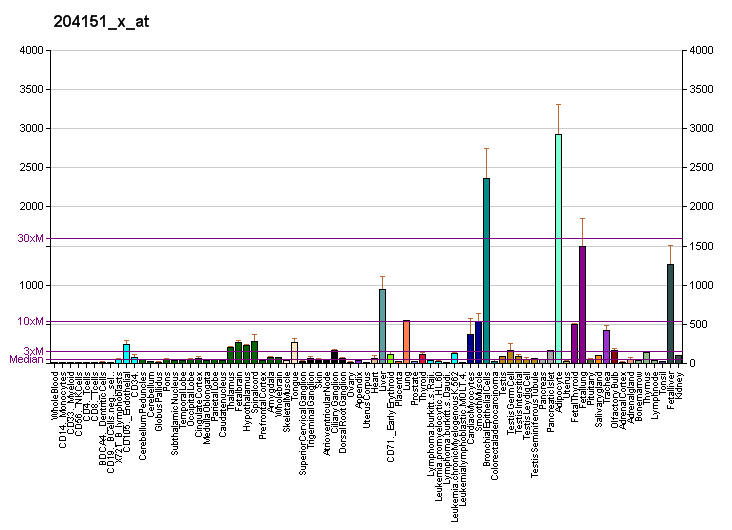

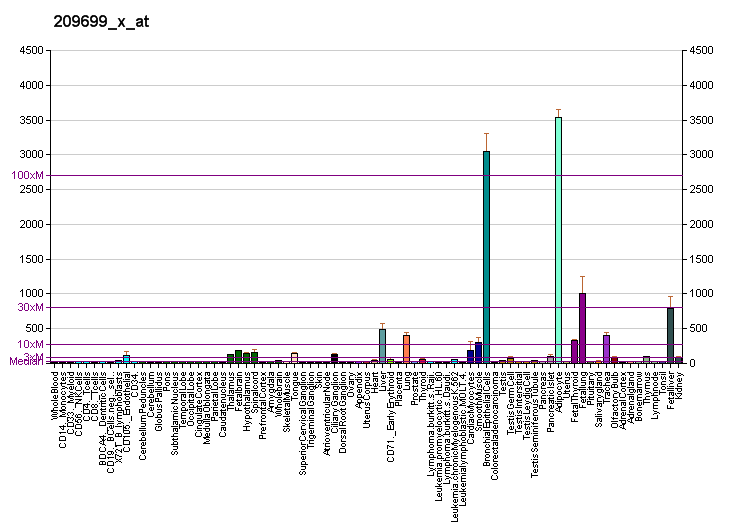
RNA expression pattern
Bgee	Human / Mouse (ortholog); Top expressed in: islet of Langerhans; gastric mucosa; right lobe of liver; right auricle of heart; olfactory zone of nasal mucosa; body of stomach; left coronary artery; ascending aorta; Descending thoracic aorta; gallbladder / Top expressed in: right kidney; human kidney; proximal tubule; morula; embryo; primary oocyte; primary visual cortex; secondary oocyte; blastocyst; muscle of thigh; More reference expression data
BioGPS	More reference expression data
Gene ontology
Molecular function	trans-1,2-dihydrobenzene-1,2-diol dehydrogenase activity; alditol:NADP+ 1-oxidoreductase activity; indanol dehydrogenase activity; aldo-keto reductase (NADP) activity; 17-alpha,20-alpha-dihydroxypregn-4-en-3-one dehydrogenase activity; androsterone dehydrogenase (B-specific) activity; phenanthrene 9,10-monooxygenase activity; oxidoreductase activity, acting on NAD(P)H, quinone or similar compound as acceptor; bile acid binding; protein binding; carboxylic acid binding; oxidoreductase activity; ketosteroid monooxygenase activity; alcohol dehydrogenase (NADP+) activity; steroid dehydrogenase activity
Cellular component	cytoplasm; cytosol; extracellular exosome
Biological process	cellular response to jasmonic acid stimulus; epithelial cell differentiation; daunorubicin metabolic process; doxorubicin metabolic process; progesterone metabolic process; bile acid metabolic process; digestion; retinal metabolic process; retinoid metabolic process; response to organophosphorus; bile acid and bile salt transport; intestinal cholesterol absorption; xenobiotic metabolic process; cholesterol homeostasis; protein homooligomerization; steroid metabolic process
Sources:Amigo / QuickGO
Orthologs
Databases	NCBI: entry; OMA: entry
Species	Human	Mouse
Entrez	1645	77337
Ensembl	ENSG00000187134	ENSMUSG00000021207
UniProt	Q04828	Q91WR5
RefSeq (mRNA)	NM_001353	NM_029901
RefSeq (protein)	NP_001344	NP_084177
Location (UCSC)	Chr 10: 4.96 – 4.98 Mb	Chr 13: 4.62 – 4.64 Mb
PubMed search
- Wikidata
View/Edit Human	View/Edit Mouse

Aldo-keto reductase family 1 member C1 is an enzyme that in humans is encoded by the AKR1C1 gene. This multi-functional enzyme is involved in degrading progesterone and androgens, as well as producing the active neurosteroid 3alpha,5alpha-THDOC. More generally, it can function as a 20α-hydroxysteroid dehydrogenase, and a 3α-hydroxysteroid dehydrogenase, among other functions.

== Superfamily of enzymes ==
This gene encodes a member of the aldo-keto reductase family which consists of more than 40 known enzymes and proteins. These enzymes catalyze the conversion of aldehydes and ketones to their corresponding alcohols by utilizing NADH and/or NADPH as cofactors. The enzymes display overlapping but distinct substrate specificity.

== AKR1C family ==
The AKR1C1 gene shares high sequence identity with three other gene members that are clustered at chromosome 10p15-p14.

HGNC Gene Symbol	Enzyme Name Aliases
AKR1C1	aldo-keto reductase family 1 member C1; 20α-hydroxysteroid dehydrogenase
AKR1C2	aldo-keto reductase family 1 member C2; 3α-hydroxysteroid dehydrogenase type 3
AKR1C3	aldo-keto reductase family 1 member C3; 3α-hydroxysteroid dehydrogenase type 2; 17β-hydroxysteroid dehydrogenase type 5; HSD17B5
AKR1C4	aldo-keto reductase family 1 member C4; 3α-hydroxysteroid dehydrogenase type 1

== See also ==
- 3α-Hydroxysteroid dehydrogenase
