= Aldo-keto reductase =

Protein family

Aldo/keto reductase family
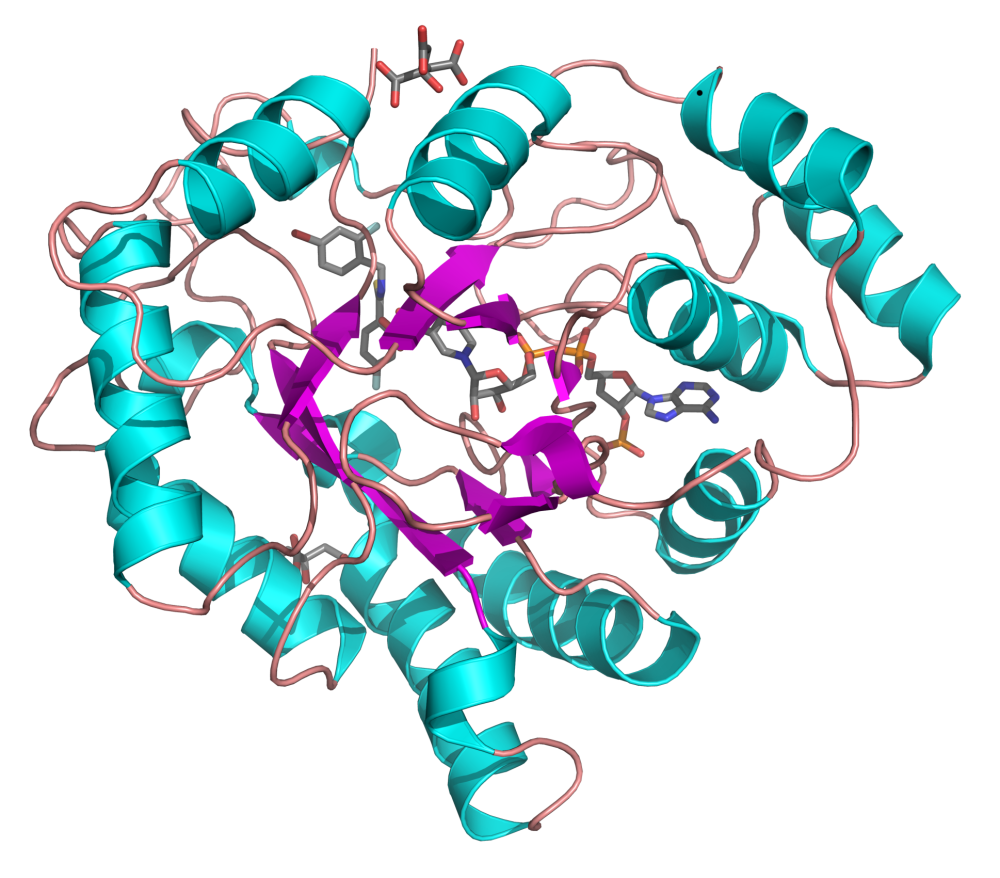
- Ribbon diagram of human aldose reductase in complex with NADP+, citrate, and IDD594, a small molecule inhibitor. From PDB: 1us0.

Identifiers
- Symbol: Aldo_ket_red
- Pfam: PF00248
- InterPro: IPR001395
- PROSITE: PDOC00061
- SCOP2: 1ads / SCOPe / SUPFAM
- CDD: cd06660
Available protein structures:
- PDB: 1a80, 1abn, 1ads, 1ae4, 1afs, 1ah0, 1ah3, 1ah4, 1az1, 1az2, 1c9w, 1cwn, 1dla, 1ef3, 1eko, 1el3, 1exb, 1frb, 1gve, 1hqt, 1hw6, 1iei, 1ihi, 1j96, 1jez, 1k8c, 1lqa, 1lwi, 1m9h, 1mar, 1mi3, 1mrq, 1mzr, 1og6, 1pwl, 1pwm, 1pyf, 1pz0, 1pz1, 1q13, 1q5m, 1qrq, 1qwk, 1r38, 1ral, 1ry0, 1ry8, 1s1p, 1s1r, 1s2a, 1s2c, 1sm9, 1t40, 1t41, 1ur3, 1us0, 1vbj, 1vp5, 1x96, 1x97, 1x98, 1xf0, 1xgd, 1xjb, 1ye4, 1ye6, 1z3n, 1z89, 1z8a, 1z9a, 1zgd, 1zq5, 1zsx, 2a79, 2acq, 2acr, 2acs, 2acu, 2agt, 2alr, 2bgq, 2bgs, 2bp1, 2c91, 2clp, 2dux, 2duz, 2dv0, 2f2k, 2f38, 2fgb, 2fvl, 2fz8, 2fz9, 2fzb, 2fzd, 2hdj, 2he5, 2he8, 2hej, 2hv5, 2hvn, 2hvo, 2i16, 2i17, 2ikg, 2ikh, 2iki, 2ikj, 2ine, 2inz, 2ipf, 2ipg, 2ipj, 2ipw, 2iq0, 2iqd, 2is7, 2isf, 2j8t, 2nvc, 2nvd, 2p5n, 2pd5, 2pd9, 2pdb, 2pdc, 2pdf, 2pdg, 2pdh, 2pdi, 2pdj, 2pdk, 2pdl, 2pdm, 2pdn, 2pdp, 2pdq, 2pdu, 2pdw, 2pdx, 2pdy, 2pev, 2pf8, 2pfh, 2pzn, 2qxw, 2r9r, 2vdg, 3bcj, 3bur, 3buv, 3bv7, 3c3u, 3cmf, 3cot, 3eau IPR001395 PF00248 (ECOD; PDBsum)
- AlphaFold: IPR001395; PF00248

The aldo-keto reductase family is a family of proteins that are subdivided into 16 categories; these include a number of related monomeric NADPH-dependent oxidoreductases, such as aldehyde reductase, aldose reductase, prostaglandin F synthase, xylose reductase, rho crystallin, and many others.

== Structure ==
All possess a similar structure, with a beta-alpha-beta fold characteristic of nucleotide binding proteins. The fold comprises a parallel beta-8/alpha-8-barrel, which contains a novel NADP-binding motif. The binding site is located in a large, deep, elliptical pocket in the C-terminal end of the beta sheet, the substrate being bound in an extended conformation. The hydrophobic nature of the pocket favours aromatic and apolar substrates over highly polar ones.

Binding of the NADPH coenzyme causes a massive conformational change, reorienting a loop, effectively locking the coenzyme in place. This binding is more similar to FAD- than to NAD(P)-binding oxidoreductases.

== Examples ==
Some proteins of this family contain a potassium channel beta chain regulatory domain; these are reported to have oxidoreductase activity.

== See also ==
- AKR1
- Steroidogenic enzyme
