= Androstanolone (disambiguation) =

Androstanolone is an androgen and anabolic steroid medication and hormone which is used mainly in the treatment of low testosterone levels in men.

Androstanolone may also refer to:

- 5α-Dihydrotestosterone (5α-androstan-17β-ol-3-one), an endogenous androgen
- 5β-Dihydrotestosterone (5β-androstan-17β-ol-3-one), an endogenous steroid
- Androsterone (5α-androstan-3α-ol-17-one), an endogenous androgen and neurosteroid
- Epiandrosterone (5α-androstan-3β-ol-17-one), an endogenous androgen
- Etiocholanolone (5β-androstan-3α-ol-17-one), an endogenous neurosteroid
- Epietiocholanolone (5β-androstan-3β-ol-17-one), an endogenous steroid

== See also ==
- Androstenolone
- Androstanediol
- Androstanedione
- Androstenediol
