= C19H32O2 =

The molecular formula C_{19}H_{32}O_{2} may refer to:

- Androstanediols
  - 3α-Androstanediol
  - 3β-Androstanediol
  - 3α,5β-Androstanediol
  - 3β,5β-Androstanediol
- CGP-7930
- Grevillol
