= C19H30O2 =

The molecular formula C_{19}H_{30}O_{2} (molar mass: 290.44 g/mol, exact mass 290.22458) may refer to:

- Androstanolone
- Androstenediol
  - 1-Androstenediol
  - 4-Androstenediol
  - 5-Androstenediol
- Androsterone
- Cetadiol
- 5α-Dihydronormethandrone
- Dihydrotestosterone
- 5β-Dihydrotestosterone
- Epiandrosterone
- Epietiocholanolone
- Etiocholanolone
