= Etiocholanediol =

Etiocholanediol (5β-androstanediol) may refer to:

- 3α-Etiocholanediol (5β-androstane-3α,17β-diol; etiocholane-3α,17β-diol) – an endogenous intermediate to epiandrosterone
- 3β-Etiocholanediol (5β-androstane-3β,17β-diol; etiocholane-3β,17β-diol) – an endogenous intermediate to epietiocholanolone

== See also ==
- Androstanediol
- Androstenediol
- Androstanedione
- Androstenedione
- Androstanolone
- Androstenolone
