= Dihydrotestosterone (disambiguation) =

Dihydrotestosterone (DHT) may refer to:

- 5α-Dihydrotestosterone – an active metabolite of testosterone and potent androgen steroid hormone
- 5β-Dihydrotestosterone – an inactive metabolite of testosterone

== See also ==
- Testosterone
- Androstanediol
- Androstanedione
