= Androstanediol =

Androstanediol may refer to:

- 3α-Androstanediol (5α-androstane-3α,17β-diol) – an endogenous neurosteroid, weak androgen and estrogen, and intermediate to androsterone
- 3β-Androstanediol (5α-androstane-3β,17β-diol) – an endogenous estrogen and intermediate to epiandrosterone
- 3α-Etiocholanediol (5β-androstane-3α,17β-diol; etiocholane-3α,17β-diol) – an endogenous intermediate to etiocholanolone
- 3β-Etiocholanediol (5β-androstane-3β,17β-diol; etiocholane-3β,17β-diol) – an endogenous intermediate to epietiocholanolone

== See also ==
- Etiocholanediol
- Androstenediol
- Androstanedione
- Androstenedione
- Androstanolone
- Androstenolone
