= Ketosteroid =

Chemical compound

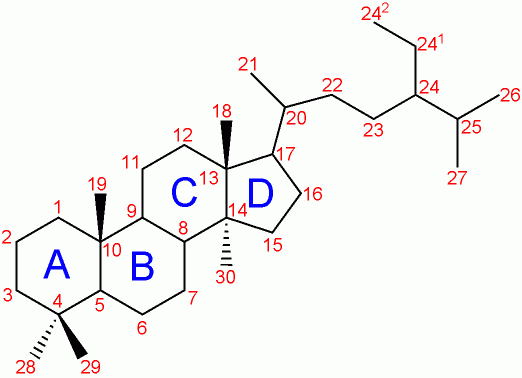
Steroid skeleton. Carbons 18 and above can be absent.

Androstenedione

Androsterone

Estrone

A ketosteroid, or an oxosteroid, is a steroid in which a hydrogen atom has been replaced with a ketone (C=O) group.

A 17-ketosteroid is a ketosteroid in which the ketone is located specifically at the C17 position (in the upper right corner of most structure diagrams).

Examples of 17-ketosteroids include:

- Androstenedione
- Androstanedione
- Androsterone
- Dehydroepiandrosterone
- Epiandrosterone
- Epietiocholanolone
- Etiocholanolone

17-Ketosteroids are endogenous steroid hormones.

== See also ==
- Hydroxysteroid
- Hydroxysteroid dehydrogenase
