= Concerns and controversies at the 2014 Asian Games =

A number of concerns and controversies surfaced before, during and after the 2014 Asian Games in Incheon, South Korea.

== Prior to the Games ==
=== Sponsorship and organization ===
The Games were hit by lack of sponsorship and a lack of interest from the public with only 18% of the tickets for the opening ceremony sold a week before the Games. Sales of tickets for rhythmic gymnast Son Yeon-jae and badminton star Lee Yong-dae's events were fast, while sales for the football competition were just seven percent and athletics eight percent. Organizers were able to generate more interest but there were a few hundred empty seats in the 61,000-capacity stadium at the start of the opening ceremony. There was a shortage of free shuttles provided for journalists and athletes in the days leading up to the Games. Organizers supplied more shuttle buses for the late-night shifts at the request of various international media organizations.

When the identity of the final torch bearer was revealed to be the actress Lee Young-ae, there were mixed reactions in the local press as she had no direct ties to sports. However, she ultimately passed the torch to a pair of young South Korean athletes and the three lighted the cauldron in unison.

=== Nationality issues ===
In basketball, Olympic Council of Asia's eligibility rule on naturalized players, which contradicted the eligibility rule set by FIBA, became controversial as such rule disqualified Quincy Davis, a US-born player playing for the Chinese Taipei team, and Andray Blatche, a naturalized player of the Philippines, from participating in the tournament. In accordance with the rule, OCA also refused South Korea's request to include Aaron Haynes in the squad, an American veteran player in Korea's basketball league who was in the process of naturalization. Both OCA officials and IAGOC claimed that the OCA's eligibility rule requires a naturalized player to live minimum of three years in the country of his naturalization before becoming eligible to play for that country. Nevertheless, Chinese Taipei Basketball Association stated that it received the positive confirmation from OCA regarding the participation of Quincy Davis, which was suddenly overturned due to the fact that Davis was two months short from residing three full years in Chinese Taipei. Many basketball fans argued that the host nation South Korea brought up the regulation rule at the last minute in order to not allow enough time for its major opponents to reconstruct their squads. Meanwhile, South Korea claimed it was just enforcing the OCA's regulation and the South Korean team themselves were also negatively affected by the rule. Despite the request of FIBA to reconsider the enforcement of the eligibility rule, both OCA and the organizing committee upheld their decision.

=== Female participants and FIBA ban on hijab ===
Saudi Arabia was the only participating NOC to not send female athletes to the Games despite international pressure from organizations including the Human Rights Watch. The country was accused of taking a step backwards from the 2012 Summer Olympics, the first time in Olympics history that Saudi Arabia lifted its ban on female participation. Mohammed al-Mishal, the secretary-general of Saudi Arabia's Olympic Committee, stated that women weren't included because none have reached the level for international competition. A member of the Saudi Olympic committee later stated that the country plans to send women to compete at the 2016 Summer Olympics.

Qatar women's basketball team was hit by FIBA ban on Muslim headscarf, known as hijab. They were scheduled to play Mongolia but were disallowed. The team eventually withdrew from the tournament, refusing to remove the hijab. FIBA claimed the ban was made due to safety concerns. Qatar officials said the decision was insulting, disrespectful of the religion, and nonsensical as combat sports allow the hijab. One player stated that they had been assured well before the Games that they would be able to wear hijab.

=== Cycling venue ===
In cycling, Hong Kong cyclists had raised concerns after they found the competition venue would be an outdoor velodrome of 333 metres in length, instead of a 250 metres indoor velodrome, which is commonly in use during the Olympic Games and the World Cup. Hong Kong Cycling Association claimed that outdoor velodromes are rare in modern cycling and they have to travel far to practice in a similar environment. The organising committee denied any advantage to the host nation. They also claimed that the track was re-coated and received approval from Union Cycliste Internationale (UCI).

== Opening ceremony programme ==
The 2014 Asian Games opening ceremony was criticised by local media for featuring more celebrities and K-pop stars than sports figures, failing to display the legacy of the event or Incheon city's culture and abasing the sports stars' presence at the event. Despite executive director Jang Jin's promise that the main characters ― Jang Dong-gun and Kim Soo-hyun would have the roles of storytellers, their presence was overshadowed by the performances of boy band JYJ and singer Psy.

== Competition issues ==
=== Women's 10 meter air-rifle ===
The Chinese team was initially disqualified after shooter Zhang Binbin was found to have violated regulations concerning maximum weight limits of her rifle. The disqualification was eventually reversed after a strong appeal by Chinese officials arguing that Zhang "didn't intend to break the rule". This allowed China to retain their team gold and a new world record. This led to a series of allegations that members of jury favoured Zhang.

=== Badminton ===
In badminton, Chinese coach Li Yongbo accused the hosts of manipulating the wind in the stadium, after China was defeated by South Korea in the final of the men's team event. Yongbo said, "We did not lose because of technique or tactics, but due to some man-made reasons. The South Koreans deliberately controlled the wind blow in the stadium and took advantage of it." Japanese coach Keita Masuda also alleged a similar case saying, "The wind in this stadium is very strange, always supporting the hosts. Every time we change sides, the wind seems to change sides as well." Thailand's Ratchanok Intanon, a former world champion, also went on to blame the "strangely strong winds" for her defeat in the quarterfinals of the women's singles event against a South Korean opponent.

=== Boxing officiating ===
Indian lightweight boxer Laishram Sarita Devi lost a highly controversial 60 kg semi-final bout against eventual silver medalist Park Jina of South Korea. Despite what many believed was a better performance by Sarita Devi, all three ringside judges ruled in favor of her opponent, leading to a 0–3 decision. The ringside judges were Braham Mohamad of Tunisia, Albino Foti of Italy, and Mariusz Josef Gorny of Poland. The decision, which drew huge criticism, left Sarita Devi in a state of shock and she was seen weeping inconsolably. Indian Olympic Association (IOA) office-bearers chose not to involve themselves with the situation, leaving Sarita Devi and her husband Thoiba Singh to lodge the protests by themselves. They were unable to pay the USD$500 fee to lodge an official protest against AIBA until Sarita's coach Lenin Meitei and an Indian journalist paid the amount on their behalf. Sarita Devi stunned officials and spectators by refusing to accept the bronze medal during the medal ceremony. Devi initially took her bronze medal and placed it around Park Jina's neck. After reluctantly receiving her medal back from Park Jina, Devi left the medal on the podium after the conclusion of the ceremony. In interviews following the incident, Sarita Devi stated, "It was a protest for all the sportsmen and women of the world against injustice in sport". She also criticized Indian officials by stating, "It has been 24 hours and not one official has come to speak with me and ask me if I am fine. They just come here to take photos with medalists and nothing else." AIBA opened disciplinary proceedings against Sarita for returning her medal and Adille Sumariwalla, the head of the Indian Mission, criticized Sarita Devi for her behavior. The following day, Sarita Devi offered an unconditional apology to AIBA for her emotional outbreak during the medal ceremony. She also expressed regret for her actions at the Olympic Council of Asia (OCA) hearing and the governing body reinstated Sarita Devi's bronze medal.

Shortly after Sarita Devi's controversial loss, Mongolian boxer Nyambayaryn Tögstsogt lost a controversial bout against South Korean Ham Sang-myeong in the 56 kg category. Nyambayar stayed in the ring for 5 minutes, protesting the results. The referees were booed by the crowd, and several Mongolian coaches arranged for a protest to be held.

In women's 57 kg, Thai boxer Sopida Satumrum lost a highly contentious decision to China's Si Haijuan. Two of the three judges scored a 38–38 draw while the third judge ruled 39–37 in favor of the Thai. Under AIBA guidelines, the bout was declared a draw and the decision was deferred to a panel of five judges, which requires a majority decision. The five judges declared Si the winner of the bout. Satumrum burst into tears after the result was announced and stated, "this is very cruel to me because I did much better than my opponent. I am 100% sure that I won." Thai officials filed an official protest but organizers dismissed it saying the decision is beyond contention.

=== Men's football ===
Worawi Makudi, the president of Football Association of Thailand, criticized the referees for making mistakes during the semi-final match between South Korea and Thailand. Coach Kiatisuk Senamuang voiced displeasure about the penalty kick awarded to South Korea following a foul outside the penalty area, which directly led to its second goal at the 45+1' minute mark. Controversy continued as a South Korean defender used his arm to block the movement of the ball twice inside South Korea's penalty area. No call was not made on the handballs. South Korea won the match 2–0. Makudi stated that he would take the matter to the Asian Football Confederation but no official protest was lodged as of 4 October, the conclusion of the Games.

=== Men's 71 kg Greco-Roman wrestling ===
Iranian wrestler Saeid Abdevali had defeated South Korean wrestler Jung Ji-hyun in the semifinal of men's 71 kg Greco-Roman event. The winner was declared to be Abdevali, but the Korean officials protested the result following which Jung Ji-hyun was declared the winner. Jung Ji-hyun went on to win the gold medal, while Abdevali was forced to settle for bronze.

=== Alleged misbehaviour of athletes ===
The organiser claimed that the misbehaviour of some of the athletes such as smoking and causing damage to property during the competition resulted in the Malaysian delegation being fined RM143,000 (US$40,000). Sepak takraw, along with bowling, sailing and rugby sevens were among the sports in which athletes incurred fines. However, this was denied by the Malaysian Tenpin Bowling Congress (MTBC), saying that the damage was not caused by their athletes because they were not staying in the damaged room reported by the organiser.

== Doping ==
Over 1,920 samples from 1,600 athletes were tested during the Games. Six athletes tested positive for banned substances and were sent home from the Games.

On 14 September, five days before the opening ceremony, Tajikistan footballer Khurshed Beknazarov tested positive for methylhexanamine. He was subsequently suspended from all football activity for 30 days. On 25 September, Cambodian soft tennis player Yi Sophany was found positive for sibutramine. Sophany suspected that Sting, her favorite energy drink may have been the cause of her positive doping test results. The doping committee informed her that sibutramine can be found on energy drinks. On 30 September, Malaysian wushu gold medalist Tai Cheau Xuen also tested positive for sibutramine. She was stripped of her gold medal. Malaysian officials appealed against the disqualification but the appeal was dismissed by the Court of Arbitration for Sport (CAS). The same day, Iraqi weightlifter Mohammed al Aifuri tested for positive for etiocholanolone and androsterone. It was his second failed drug test in six years. He faces a ban by the International Weightlifting Federation (IWF), which had banned him once before in 2008 for taking metandienone. On 1 October, Syrian karate fighter Nour-Aldin al-Kurdi tested positive for clenbuterol. On 3 October, Chinese hammer thrower Zhang Wenxiu became the second gold medalist to be stripped of their gold medal after testing positive for zeranol.

However, on 6 May 2015, Zhang's gold medal was returned after further testing performed by independent specialists that the presence zeranol was the consequence of the consumption of contaminated food.
