= 3alpha-hydroxy-5beta-androstane-17-one 3alpha-dehydrogenase =

Enzyme

3-alpha-hydroxy-5-beta-androstane-17-one 3-alpha-dehydrogenase

Identifiers
- EC no.: 1.1.1.152
- CAS no.: 37250-77-4

Databases
- IntEnz: IntEnz view
- BRENDA: BRENDA entry
- ExPASy: NiceZyme view
- KEGG: KEGG entry
- MetaCyc: metabolic pathway
- PRIAM: profile
- PDB structures: RCSB PDB PDBe PDBsum
- Gene Ontology: AmiGO / QuickGO
Search
- PMC: articles
- PubMed: articles
- NCBI: proteins

In enzymology, 3alpha-hydroxy-5beta-androstane-17-one 3alpha-dehydrogenase (EC 1.1.1.152) is an enzyme that catalyzes the chemical reaction

etiocholanolone
+ NAD^{+}
H^{+}
H^{+}
etiocholanedione
+ NADH

The two substrates of this enzyme are etiocholanolone and oxidised nicotinamide adenine dinucleotide (NAD^{+}). Its products are etiocholanedione, reduced NADH, and a proton.

This enzyme belongs to the family of oxidoreductases, specifically those acting on the CH-OH group of donor with NAD^{+} or NADP^{+} as acceptor. The systematic name of this enzyme class is 3alpha-hydroxy-5beta-steroid:NAD^{+} 3-oxidoreductase. Other names in common use include etiocholanolone 3alpha-dehydrogenase, etiocholanolone 3alpha-dehydrogenase, and 3alpha-hydroxy-5beta-steroid dehydrogenase. This enzyme participates in androgen and estrogen metabolism.
