= 5β-Dihydrotestosterone =

Names
- IUPAC name 17β-Hydroxy-5β-androstan-3-one
- Systematic IUPAC name (1S,3aS,3bR,5aR,9aS,9bS,11aS)-1-Hydroxy-9a,11a-dimethylhexadecahydro-7H-cyclopenta[a]phenanthren-7-one
- Other names 5β-Androstan-17β-ol-3-one; Etiocholan-17β-ol-3-one; 5β-Dihydrotestosterone; 5β-DHT

Identifiers
CAS Number	571-22-2
3D model (JSmol)	Interactive image
ChEBI	CHEBI:2150
ChEMBL	ChEMBL373357
ChemSpider	10827
DrugBank	DB07447
ECHA InfoCard	100.164.933
EC Number	637-207-6
KEGG	C05293
PubChem CID	11302
UNII	SVX1G0C5VD
CompTox Dashboard (EPA)	DTXSID0022488
- InChI: InChI=1S/C19H30O2/c1-18-9-7-13(20)11-12(18)3-4-14-15-5-6-17(21)19(15,2)10-8-16(14)18/h12,14-17,21H,3-11H2,1-2H3/t12-,14+,15+,16+,17+,18+,19+/m1/s1 Key: NVKAWKQGWWIWPM-MISPCMORSA-N
- SMILES: C[C@]12CCC(=O)C[C@H]1CC[C@@H]3[C@@H]2CC[C@]4([C@H]3CC[C@@H]4O)C

Properties
Chemical formula	C_{19}H_{30}O_{2}
Molar mass	290.447 g·mol^{−1}

Hazards
- GHS labelling
Pictograms	(GHS07: Exclamation mark) (GHS08: Health hazard)
Signal word	Danger
Hazard statements	H302, H312, H332, H350, H360
Precautionary statements	P203, P261, P264, P270, P271, P280, P301+P317, P302+P352, P304+P340, P317, P318, P321, P330, P362+P364, P405, P501
- Except where otherwise noted, data are given for materials in their standard state (at 25 °C [77 °F], 100 kPa). Infobox references

5β-Dihydrotestosterone (5β-DHT), also known as 5β-androstan-17β-ol-3-one or as etiocholan-17β-ol-3-one, is an etiocholane (5β-androstane) steroid as well as an inactive metabolite of testosterone formed by 5β-reductase in the liver and bone marrow and an intermediate in the formation of 3α,5β-androstanediol and 3β,5β-androstanediol (by 3α- and 3β-hydroxysteroid dehydrogenase) and, from them, respectively, etiocholanolone and epietiocholanolone (by 17β-hydroxysteroid dehydrogenase). Unlike its isomer 5α-dihydrotestosterone (5α-DHT or simply DHT), 5β-DHT either does not bind to or binds only very weakly to the androgen receptor. 5β-DHT is notable among metabolites of testosterone in that, due to the fusion of the A and B rings in the cis orientation, it has an extremely angular molecular shape, and this could be related to its lack of androgenic activity. 5β-DHT, unlike 5α-DHT, is also inactive in terms of neurosteroid activity, although its metabolite, etiocholanolone, does possess such activity.

== See also ==
- 3α-Androstanediol
- 3β-Androstanediol
- Androsterone
- Epiandrosterone
