= Etiocholane =

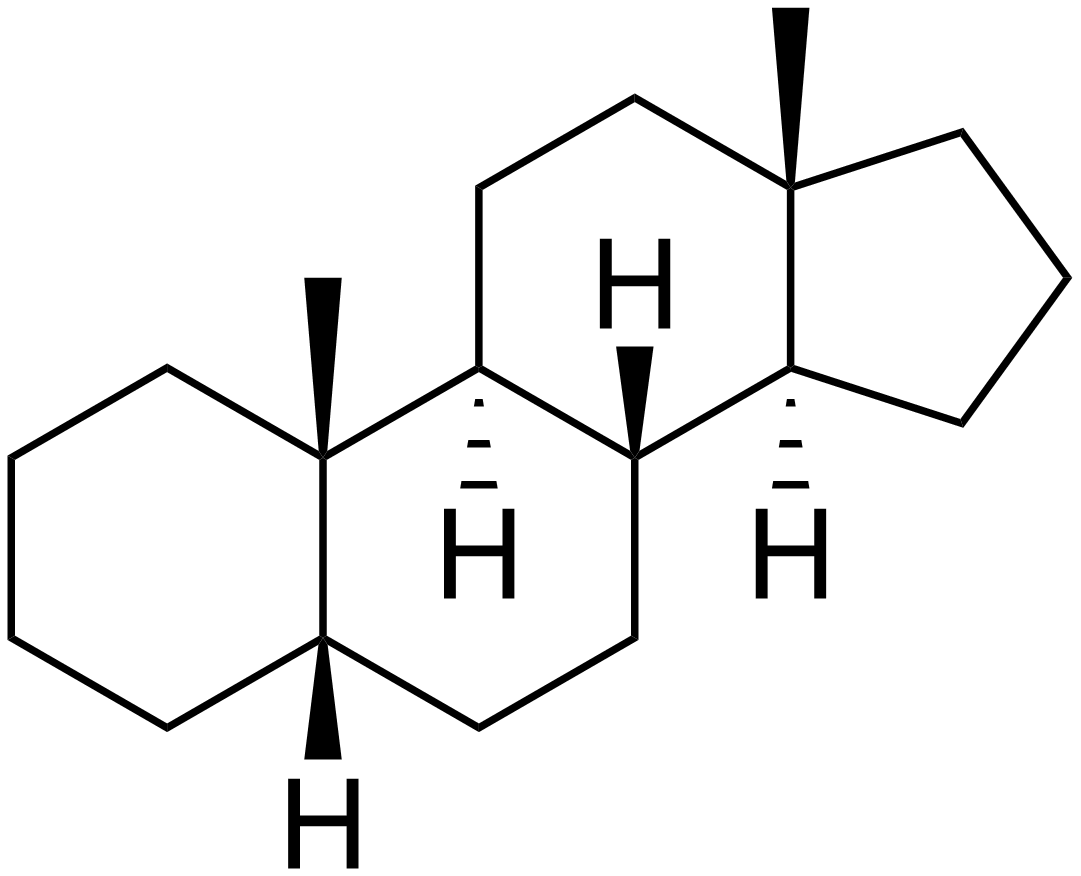

Names
- IUPAC name 5β-Androstane
- Systematic IUPAC name (3aS,3bS,5aS,9aS,9bS,11aS)-9a,11a-Dimethylhexadecahydro-1H-cyclopenta[a]phenanthrene
- Other names 5-Epiandrostane

Identifiers
CAS Number	438-23-3
3D model (JSmol)	Interactive image
ChemSpider	5256799
PubChem CID	6857462
UNII	709K2QDA3I
CompTox Dashboard (EPA)	DTXSID401032191
- InChI: InChI=1S/C19H32/c1-18-11-5-7-16(18)15-9-8-14-6-3-4-12-19(14,2)17(15)10-13-18/h14-17H,3-13H2,1-2H3/t14-,15-,16-,17-,18-,19-/m0/s1 Key: QZLYKIGBANMMBK-DYKIIFRCSA-N; InChI=1/C19H32/c1-18-11-5-7-16(18)15-9-8-14-6-3-4-12-19(14,2)17(15)10-13-18/h14-17H,3-13H2,1-2H3/t14-,15-,16-,17-,18-,19-/m0/s1 Key: QZLYKIGBANMMBK-DYKIIFRCBC
- SMILES: C[C@@]12CCC[C@H]1[C@@H]3CC[C@@H]4CCCC[C@@]4([C@H]3CC2)C

Properties
Chemical formula	C_{19}H_{32}
Molar mass	260.465 g/mol
- Except where otherwise noted, data are given for materials in their standard state (at 25 °C [77 °F], 100 kPa). Infobox references

Etiocholane, also known as 5β-androstane or 5-epiandrostane, is an androstane (C19) steroid. It is the 5β-isomer of androstane. Etiocholanes include 5β-androstanedione, 5β-dihydrotestosterone, 3α,5β-androstanediol, 3β,5β-androstanediol, etiocholanolone, epietiocholanolone, and 3α,5β-androstanol.

17β-Ethyletiocholanes, or 5β-pregnanes, include 5β-dihydroprogesterone, pregnanolone, and epipregnanolone, as well as pregnanediol and pregnanetriol.

== See also ==
- C_{19}H_{32}
