= Androsterone =

Endogenous steroid hormone

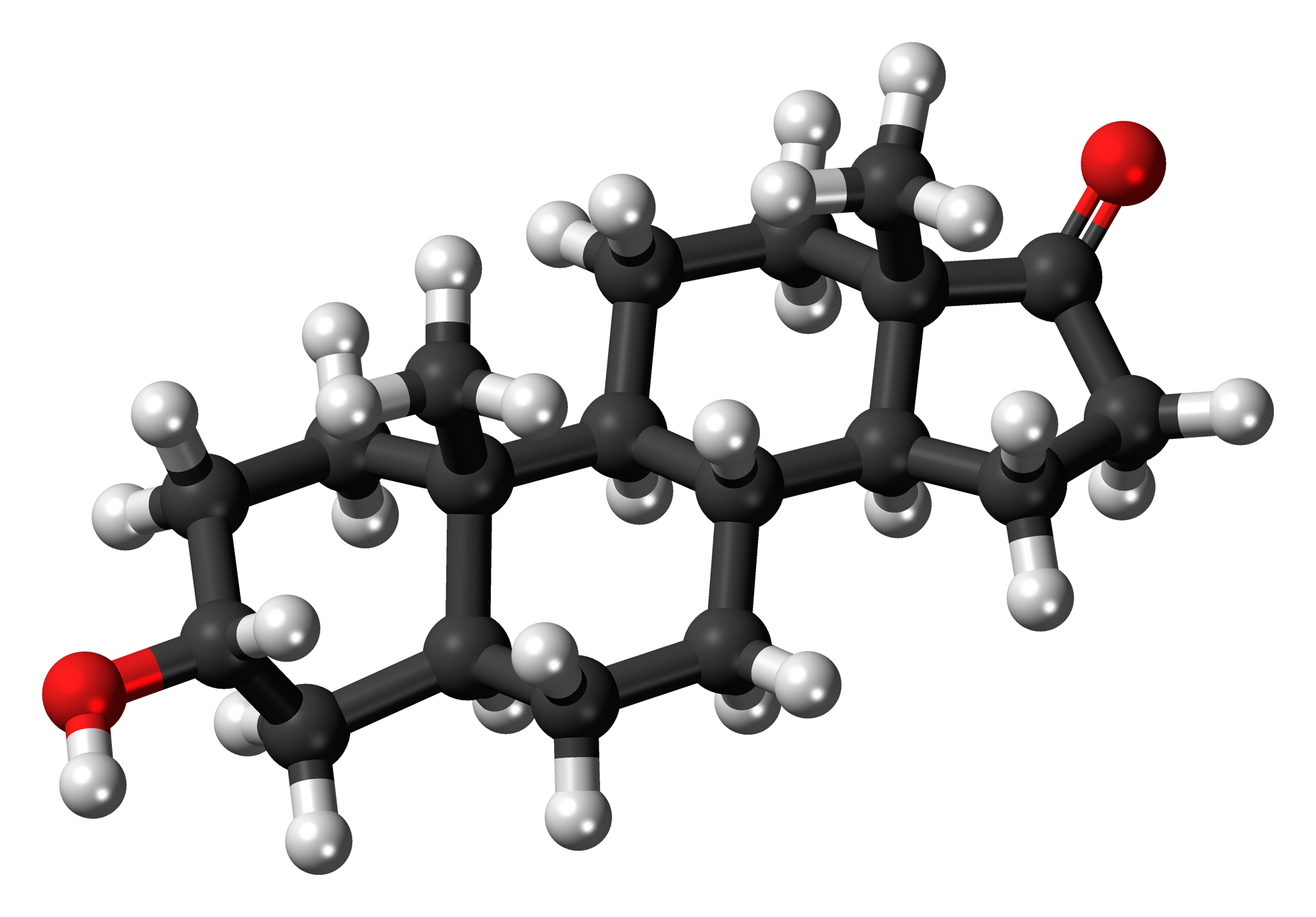

Clinical data
- Other names: 3α-hydroxy-5α-androstan-17-one, 5α-androstan-3α-ol-17-one
- ATC code: none

Identifiers
- IUPAC name: (3R,5S,8R,9S,10S,13S,14S)-3-hydroxy-10,13-dimethyl-1,2,3,4,5,6,7,8,9,11,12,14,15,16-tetradecahydrocyclopenta[a]phenanthren-17-one
- CAS Number: 53-41-8
- PubChem CID: 5879
- ChemSpider: 5668
- UNII: C24W7J5D5R
- ChEBI: CHEBI:16032
- ChEMBL: ChEMBL87285
- CompTox Dashboard (EPA): DTXSID3036525
- ECHA InfoCard: 100.000.159

Chemical and physical data
- Formula: C_{19}H_{30}O_{2}
- Molar mass: 290.447 g·mol^{−1}
- 3D model (JSmol): Interactive image
- SMILES: O=C2[C@]1(CC[C@H]3[C@H]([C@@H]1CC2)CC[C@H]4C[C@H](O)CC[C@]34C)C
- InChI: InChI=1S/C19H30O2/c1-18-9-7-13(20)11-12(18)3-4-14-15-5-6-17(21)19(15,2)10-8-16(14)18/h12-16,20H,3-11H2,1-2H3/t12-,13+,14-,15-,16-,18-,19-/m0/s1; Key:QGXBDMJGAMFCBF-HLUDHZFRSA-N

Androsterone, or 3α-hydroxy-5α-androstan-17-one, is an endogenous steroid hormone, neurosteroid, and putative pheromone. It is a weak androgen with a potency that is approximately 1/7 that of testosterone. Androsterone is a metabolite of testosterone and dihydrotestosterone (DHT). In addition, it can be converted back into DHT via 3α-hydroxysteroid dehydrogenase and 17β-hydroxysteroid dehydrogenase, bypassing conventional intermediates such as androstanedione and testosterone, and as such, can be considered to be a metabolic intermediate in its own right.

Androsterone is also known to be an inhibitory androstane neurosteroid, acting as a positive allosteric modulator of the GABA_{A} receptor, and possesses anticonvulsant effects. The unnatural enantiomer of androsterone is more potent as a positive allosteric modulator of GABA_{A} receptors and as an anticonvulsant than the natural form. Androsterone's 3β-isomer is epiandrosterone, and its 5β-epimer is etiocholanolone. The 3β,5β-isomer is epietiocholanolone.

== Biological function ==
Androsterone has generally been considered to be an inactive metabolite of testosterone, which when conjugated by glucuronidation and sulfation allows testosterone to be removed from the body, but it is a weak neurosteroid that can cross into the brain and could have effects on brain function.

However, the view of androsterone as generally being of low significance has been challenged by recent research which suggests that androsterone significantly affects masculinization in mammalian fetuses. Masculinization of the external genitalia in humans is subject to dihydrotestosterone (DHT) derived via the recognised androgenic pathway and also via a backdoor pathway. Androstanediol, a metabolite of androsterone, can be used a marker of the backdoor pathway of DHT synthesis. Spectrometric studies identify androsterone as the main backdoor androgen in the human male fetus. Circulating levels are sex dependent, DHT being essentially absent in the female, in which titres of backdoor intermediates also are very low.

In males, backdoor intermediates occur mainly in the liver and adrenal of the fetus, and in the placenta — hardly at all in the testis. Instead, progesterone in the placenta is the main backdoor substrate for androgen synthesis. This also is consistent with the observation that placental insufficiency has been associated with disruptions of development of fetal genitalia.

=== Pheromone ===
Androsterone is found in the human axilla and skin as well as in the urine. It may also be secreted by human sebaceous glands. It is described as having a musky odor similar to that of androstenol. Androsterone has been found to affect human behavior when smelled.

== Biochemistry ==
=== Biosynthesis ===
Androsterone and its 5β-isomer, etiocholanolone, are produced in the body as metabolites of testosterone. Testosterone is converted to 5α-dihydrotestosterone and 5β-dihydrotestosterone by 5α-reductase and 5β-reductase, respectively. The enzyme 3α-hydroxysteroid dehydrogenase converts the reduced forms to 3α-androstanediol and 3β-androstanediol, which are subsequently converted by 17β-hydroxysteroid dehydrogenase to androsterone and etiocholanolone, respectively. Androsterone and etiocholanolone can also be formed from androstenedione via the action of 5α-reductase and 5β-reductase forming 5α-androstanedione and 5β-androstanedione which are then converted to androsterone and etiocholanolone by 3α-hydroxysteroid dehydrogenase and 3β-hydroxysteroid dehydrogenase, respectively.

=== Metabolism ===
Androsterone is sulfated into androsterone sulfate and glucuronidated into androsterone glucuronide and these conjugates are excreted in urine.

== Chemistry ==
=== Sources ===
Androsterone has been shown to naturally occur in pine pollen, celery, truffles and is well known in many animal species.

== History ==
Androsterone was first isolated in 1931, by NSDAP-Member Adolf Friedrich Johann Butenandt and Kurt Tscherning. They distilled over 17,000 liters (3,700 imp gal; 4,500 U.S. gal) of male urine, from which they got 50 milligrams (0.77 gr) of crystalline androsterone, which was sufficient to find that the chemical formula was very similar to estrone. They collected the urine of male prisoners on the premises of various Berlin police stations.

== See also ==
- Androgen backdoor pathway
- List of androgens/anabolic steroids
- List of neurosteroids § Androstanes
- List of neurosteroids § Pheromones and pherines
- 3α-Hydroxysteroid dehydrogenase
