= C19H32 =

The molecular formula C_{19}H_{32} (molar mass: 260.46 g/mol, exact mass: 260.2504 u) may refer to:

- Androstane
- Etiocholane, also known as 5β-androstane or 5-epiandrostane
