= 3α-Etiocholanediol =

Names
- IUPAC name 5β-Androstane-3α,17β-diol
- Systematic IUPAC name (1S,3aS,3bR,5aR,7R,9aS,9bS,11aS)-9a,11a-Dimethylhexadecahydro-1H-cyclopenta[a]phenanthrene-1,7-diol
- Other names Etiocholanediol; Etiocholane-3α,17β-diol

Identifiers
CAS Number	1851-23-6
3D model (JSmol)	Interactive image
ChEBI	CHEBI:36714
ChEMBL	ChEMBL410494
ChemSpider	118551
PubChem CID	134494
UNII	D8A379RX68
- InChI: InChI=1S/C19H32O2/c1-18-9-7-13(20)11-12(18)3-4-14-15-5-6-17(21)19(15,2)10-8-16(14)18/h12-17,20-21H,3-11H2,1-2H3/t12-,13-,14+,15+,16+,17+,18+,19+/m1/s1 Key: CBMYJHIOYJEBSB-GCXXXECGSA-N
- SMILES: C[C@]12CC[C@H](C[C@H]1CC[C@@H]3[C@@H]2CC[C@]4([C@H]3CC[C@@H]4O)C)O

Properties
Chemical formula	C_{19}H_{32}O_{2}
Molar mass	292.463 g·mol^{−1}
- Except where otherwise noted, data are given for materials in their standard state (at 25 °C [77 °F], 100 kPa). Infobox references

3α-Etiocholanediol, or simply etiocholanediol, also known as 3α,5β-androstanediol or as etiocholane-3α,17β-diol, is a naturally occurring etiocholane (5β-androstane) steroid and an endogenous metabolite of testosterone. It is formed from 5β-dihydrotestosterone (after 5β-reduction of testosterone) and is further transformed into etiocholanolone.

== See also ==
- 3β-Etiocholanediol
- 3α-Androstanediol
- 3β-Androstanediol
