= Testosterone =

Primary male sex hormone

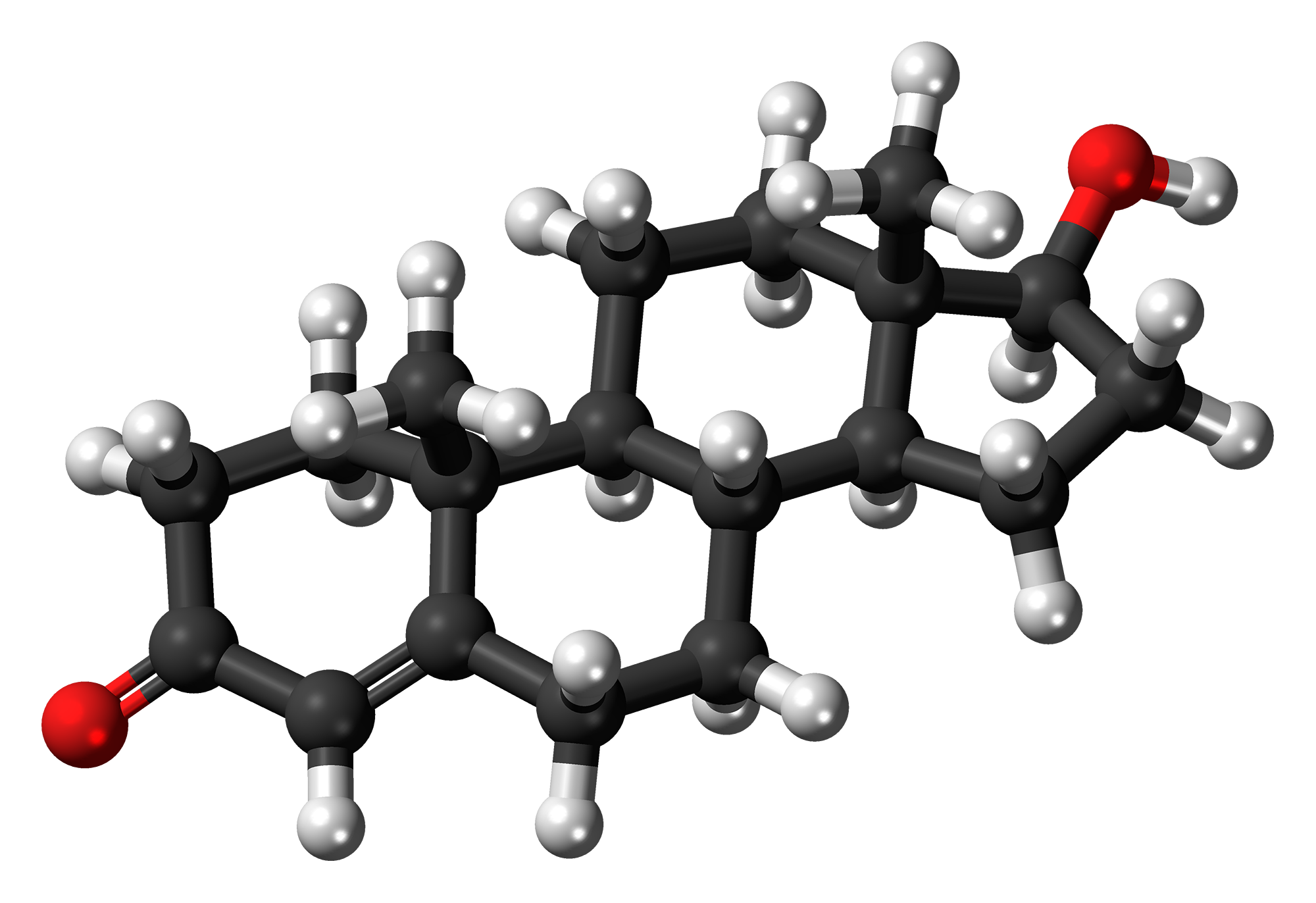

Names
- IUPAC name 17β-Hydroxyandrost-4-en-3-one
- Systematic IUPAC name (1S,3aS,3bR,9aR,9bS,11aS)-1-Hydroxy-9a,11a-dimethyl-1,2,3,3a,3b,4,5,8,9,9a,9b,10,11,11a-tetradecahydro-7H-cyclopenta[a]phenanthren-7-one
- Other names Androst-4-en-17β-ol-3-one

Identifiers
CAS Number	58-22-0
3D model (JSmol)	Interactive image
ChEBI	CHEBI:17347
ChEMBL	ChEMBL386630
ChemSpider	5791
DrugBank	DB00624
ECHA InfoCard	100.000.336
EC Number	200-370-5
KEGG	D00075
PubChem CID	6013
UNII	3XMK78S47O
CompTox Dashboard (EPA)	DTXSID8022371
- InChI: InChI=1S/C19H28O2/c1-18-9-7-13(20)11-12(18)3-4-14-15-5-6-17(21)19(15,2)10-8-16(14)18/h11,14-17,21H,3-10H2,1-2H3/t14-,15-,16-,17-,18-,19-/m0/s1 Key: MUMGGOZAMZWBJJ-DYKIIFRCSA-N
- SMILES: O=C1C=C2[C@](C)(CC1)[C@H]3CC[C@]4(C)[C@H](CC[C@H]4[C@@H]3CC2)O

Properties
Chemical formula	C_{19}H_{28}O_{2}
Molar mass	288.431 g·mol^{−1}
Melting point	151.0 °C (303.8 °F; 424.1 K)

Pharmacology
ATC code	G03BA03 (WHO)
License data	EU EMA: by INN
Routes of administration	Transdermal (gel, cream, solution, patch), by mouth (as testosterone undecanoate), in the cheek, intranasal (gel), intramuscular injection (as esters), subcutaneous pellets
- Pharmacokinetics
Bioavailability	Oral: very low (due to extensive first pass metabolism)
Protein binding	97.0–99.5% (to SHBG and albumin)
Metabolism	Liver (mainly reduction and conjugation)
Biological half-life	30–60 minutes
Excretion	Urine (90%), feces (6%)
- Except where otherwise noted, data are given for materials in their standard state (at 25 °C [77 °F], 100 kPa). verify (what is ?) Infobox references

Testosterone is the primary male sex hormone and androgen in males. In humans, testosterone drives the development of male reproductive tissues such as testicles and prostate, as well as promoting secondary sexual characteristics such as increased muscle and bone mass, and the growth of body hair. It is associated with increased aggression, sex drive, dominance, courtship display, and a wide range of behavioral characteristics. In addition, testosterone in both sexes is involved in health and well-being, where it has a significant effect on overall mood, cognition, social and sexual behavior, metabolism and energy output, the cardiovascular system, and in the prevention of osteoporosis. Insufficient levels of testosterone in men may lead to abnormalities including frailty, accumulation of adipose fat tissue within the body, anxiety and depression, sexual performance deficits, and bone loss.

Excessive levels of testosterone in men may be associated with hyperandrogenism, higher risk of heart failure, increased mortality in men with prostate cancer, and male pattern baldness.

Testosterone is a steroid hormone from the androstane class containing a ketone and a hydroxyl group at positions three and seventeen respectively. It is biosynthesized in several steps from cholesterol and is converted in the liver to inactive metabolites. It exerts its action through binding to and activation of the androgen receptor. In humans and most other vertebrates, testosterone is secreted primarily by the testicles of males and, to a lesser extent, the ovaries of females. On average, in adult males, levels of testosterone are about seven to eight times as great as in adult females. As the metabolism of testosterone in males is more pronounced, the daily production is about 20 times greater in men. Females are also more sensitive to the hormone.

In addition to its role as a natural hormone, testosterone is used as a medication to treat hypogonadism and breast cancer. Since testosterone levels decrease as men age, testosterone is sometimes used in older men to counteract this deficiency. It is also used illicitly to enhance physique and performance, for instance in athletes. The World Anti-Doping Agency lists it as S1 Anabolic agent substance "prohibited at all times".

== Biological effects ==
=== Effects on physiological development ===
In general, androgens such as testosterone promote protein synthesis and thus growth of tissues with androgen receptors. Testosterone can be described as having anabolic and androgenic (virilising) effects, though these categorical descriptions are somewhat arbitrary, as there is a great deal of mutual overlap between them. The relative potency of these effects can depend on various factors and is a topic of ongoing research. Testosterone can either directly exert effects on target tissues or be metabolized by 5α-reductase into dihydrotestosterone (DHT) or aromatized to estradiol (E2) the major hormone in producing the female body type. Both testosterone and DHT bind to an androgen receptor; however, DHT has a stronger binding affinity than testosterone and may have more androgenic effect in certain tissues at lower levels.

- Anabolic effects include growth of muscle mass and strength, increased bone density and strength, and stimulation of linear growth and bone maturation.
- Androgenic effects include maturation of the sex organs, particularly the penis, and the formation of the scrotum in the fetus, and after birth (usually at puberty) a deepening of the voice, growth of facial hair (such as the beard) and axillary (underarm) hair. Many of these fall into the category of male secondary sex characteristics.

Testosterone effects can also be classified by the age of usual occurrence. For postnatal effects in both males and females, these are mostly dependent on the levels and duration of circulating free testosterone.

==== Before birth ====
Effects before birth are divided into two categories, classified in relation to the stages of development.

The first period occurs between 4 and 6 weeks of the gestation. Examples include genital virilisation such as midline fusion, phallic urethra, scrotal thinning and rugation, and phallic enlargement; although the role of testosterone is far smaller than that of dihydrotestosterone. There is also development of the prostate gland and seminal vesicles.

During the second trimester, androgen level is associated with sex formation. Specifically, testosterone, along with anti-Müllerian hormone (AMH) promote growth of the Wolffian duct and degeneration of the Müllerian duct respectively. This period affects the femininization or masculinization of the fetus and can be a better predictor of feminine or masculine behaviors such as sex typed behavior than an adult's own levels. Prenatal androgens apparently influence interests and engagement in gendered activities and have moderate effects on spatial abilities. Among women with congenital adrenal hyperplasia, a male-typical play in childhood correlated with reduced satisfaction with the female gender and reduced heterosexual interest in adulthood.

==== Early infancy ====
Early infancy androgen effects are the least understood. In the first weeks of life for male infants, testosterone levels rise. The levels remain in a pubertal range for a few months, but usually reach the barely detectable levels of childhood by 4–7 months of age. The function of this rise in humans is unknown. One theory holds that brain masculinization is occurring since no significant changes have been identified in other parts of the body. The male brain is masculinized by the aromatization of testosterone into estradiol, which crosses the blood–brain barrier and enters the male brain, whereas female fetuses have α-fetoprotein, which binds the estrogen so that female brains are not affected.

==== Before puberty ====
Before puberty, effects of rising androgen levels occur in both boys and girls. These effects include adult-type body odor, increased oiliness of skin and hair, acne, pubarche (appearance of pubic hair), axillary hair (armpit hair), growth spurt, accelerated bone maturation, and facial hair.

==== Pubertal ====
Pubertal effects begin to occur when androgen has been higher than normal adult female levels for months or years. In males, these are usual late pubertal effects, and occur in women after prolonged periods of heightened levels of free testosterone in the blood. The effects include:

- Growth of spermatogenic tissue in testicles, male fertility, penis or clitoris enlargement, increased libido and frequency of erection or clitoral engorgement occurs.
- Growth of jaw, brow, chin, and nose and remodeling of facial bone contours, in conjunction with human growth hormone occurs.
- Completion of bone maturation and termination of growth. This occurs indirectly via estradiol metabolites and hence more gradually in men than women.
- Increased muscle strength and mass, shoulders become broader and rib cage expands, deepening of voice, growth of the Adam's apple.
- Enlargement of sebaceous glands. This enlargement might cause acne, subcutaneous fat in face decreases.
- Pubic hair extends to thighs and up toward umbilicus, development of facial hair (sideburns, beard, moustache), loss of scalp hair (androgenetic alopecia), increase in chest hair, periareolar hair, perianal hair, leg hair, armpit hair.

==== Adult ====
Testosterone is necessary for normal sperm development. It activates genes in Sertoli cells, which promote differentiation of spermatogonia. It regulates acute hypothalamic–pituitary–adrenal axis (HPA axis) response under dominance challenge. Androgens including testosterone enhance muscle growth. Testosterone also regulates the population of thromboxane A_{2} receptors on megakaryocytes and platelets and hence platelet aggregation in humans.

Adult testosterone effects are more clearly demonstrable in males than in females, but are likely important to both sexes. Some of these effects may decline as testosterone levels might decrease in the later decades of adult life.

The brain is also affected by this sexual differentiation; the enzyme aromatase converts testosterone into estradiol that is responsible for masculinization of the brain in male mice. In humans, masculinization of the fetal brain appears, by observation of gender preference in patients with congenital disorders of androgen formation or androgen receptor function, to be associated with functional androgen receptors.

There are some differences between a male and female brain that may be due to different testosterone levels, one of them being size: the male human brain is, on average, larger.

=== Health effects ===
Testosterone does not appear to increase the risk of developing prostate cancer. In people who have undergone testosterone deprivation therapy, testosterone increases beyond the castrate level have been shown to increase the rate of spread of an existing prostate cancer.

Conflicting results have been obtained concerning the importance of testosterone in maintaining cardiovascular health. Nevertheless, maintaining normal testosterone levels in elderly men has been shown to improve many parameters that are thought to reduce cardiovascular disease risk, such as increased lean body mass, decreased visceral fat mass, decreased total cholesterol, and improved glycemic control.

High androgen levels are associated with menstrual cycle irregularities in both clinical populations and healthy women. There also can be effects in unusual hair growth, acne, weight gain, infertility, and sometimes even scalp hair loss. These effects are seen largely in women with polyendocrine metabolic ovarian syndrome (PMOS). For women with PMOS, hormones like birth control pills can be used to help lessen the effects of this increased level of testosterone.

Attention, memory, and spatial ability are key cognitive functions affected by testosterone in humans. Preliminary evidence suggests that low testosterone levels may be a risk factor for cognitive decline and possibly for dementia of the Alzheimer's type, a key argument in life extension medicine for the use of testosterone in anti-aging therapies. Much of the literature, however, suggests a curvilinear or even quadratic relationship between spatial performance and circulating testosterone, where both hypo- and hypersecretion (deficient- and excessive-secretion) of circulating androgens have negative effects on cognition.

==== Immune system and inflammation ====
Testosterone deficiency is associated with an increased risk of metabolic syndrome, cardiovascular disease and mortality, which are also sequelae of chronic inflammation. Testosterone plasma concentration inversely correlates to multiple biomarkers of inflammation including CRP, interleukin 1 beta, interleukin 6, TNF alpha and endotoxin concentration, as well as leukocyte count. As demonstrated by a meta-analysis, substitution therapy with testosterone results in a significant reduction of inflammatory markers. These effects are mediated by different mechanisms with synergistic action. In androgen-deficient men with concomitant autoimmune thyroiditis, substitution therapy with testosterone leads to a decrease in thyroid autoantibody titres and an increase in thyroid's secretory capacity (SPINA-GT).

==== Medical use ====
Testosterone is used as a medication for the treatment of male hypogonadism, gender dysphoria, and certain types of breast cancer. This is known as hormone replacement therapy (HRT) or testosterone replacement therapy (TRT), which maintains serum testosterone levels in the normal range. Decline of testosterone production with age has led to interest in androgen replacement therapy. It is unclear if the use of testosterone for low levels due to aging is beneficial or harmful.

Testosterone is included in the World Health Organization's list of essential medicines, which are the most important medications needed in a basic health system. It is available as a generic medication. It can be administered as a cream or transdermal patch that is applied to the skin, by injection into a muscle, as a tablet that is placed in the cheek, or by ingestion.

Common side effects from testosterone medication include acne, swelling, and breast enlargement in males. Serious side effects may include liver toxicity, heart disease (though a randomized trial found no evidence of major adverse cardiac events compared to placebo in men with low testosterone), and behavioral changes. Women and children who are exposed may develop virilization. It is recommended that individuals with prostate cancer not use the medication. It can cause harm if used during pregnancy or breastfeeding.

2020 guidelines from the American College of Physicians support the discussion of testosterone treatment in adult men with age-related low levels of testosterone who have sexual dysfunction. They recommend yearly evaluation regarding possible improvement and, if none, to discontinue testosterone; physicians should consider intramuscular treatments, rather than transdermal treatments, due to costs and since the effectiveness and harm of either method is similar. Testosterone treatment for reasons other than possible improvement of sexual dysfunction may not be recommended. Current clinical guidelines recommend comprehensive baseline evaluation including complete blood count, lipid panel, prostate-specific antigen, and cardiovascular risk assessment before initiating testosterone replacement therapy. Regular monitoring during treatment typically includes hematocrit levels every 3-6 months to prevent polycythemia, along with PSA monitoring in men over 40.

=== Behavioral correlations ===
==== Sexual arousal ====
Testosterone levels follow a circadian rhythm that peaks early each day, regardless of sexual activity.

In women, correlations may exist between positive orgasm experience and testosterone levels. Studies have shown small or inconsistent correlations between testosterone levels and male orgasm experience, as well as sexual assertiveness in both sexes.

Sexual arousal and masturbation in women produce small increases in testosterone concentrations. The plasma levels of various steroids significantly increase after masturbation in men and the testosterone levels correlate to those levels.

==== Mammalian studies ====
Studies conducted in rats have indicated that their degree of sexual arousal is sensitive to reductions in testosterone. When testosterone-deprived rats were given medium levels of testosterone, their sexual behaviors (copulation, partner preference, etc.) resumed, but not when given low amounts of the same hormone. Therefore, these mammals may provide a model for studying clinical populations among humans with sexual arousal deficits such as hypoactive sexual desire disorder.

Every mammalian species examined demonstrated a marked increase in a male's testosterone level upon encountering a novel female. The reflexive testosterone increases in male mice is related to the male's initial level of sexual arousal.

In non-human primates, it may be that testosterone in puberty stimulates sexual arousal, which allows the primate to increasingly seek out sexual experiences with females and thus creates a sexual preference for females. Some research has also indicated that if testosterone is eliminated in an adult male human or other adult male primate's system, its sexual motivation decreases, but there is no corresponding decrease in ability to engage in sexual activity (mounting, ejaculating, etc.).

In accordance with sperm competition theory, testosterone levels are shown to increase as a response to previously neutral stimuli when conditioned to become sexual in male rats. This reaction engages penile reflexes (such as erection and ejaculation) that aid in sperm competition when more than one male is present in mating encounters, allowing for more production of successful sperm and a higher chance of reproduction.

==== Males ====
In men, higher levels of testosterone are associated with periods of sexual activity.

Men who watch a sexually explicit movie have an average increase of 35% in testosterone, peaking at 60–90 minutes after the end of the film, but no increase is seen in men who watch sexually neutral films. Men who watch sexually explicit films also report increased motivation and competitiveness, and decreased exhaustion. A link has also been found between relaxation following sexual arousal and testosterone levels.

==== Females ====
Androgens may modulate the physiology of vaginal tissue and contribute to female genital sexual arousal. Women's level of testosterone is higher when measured pre-intercourse vs. pre-cuddling, as well as post-intercourse vs. post-cuddling. There is a time lag effect when testosterone is administered, on genital arousal in women. In addition, a continuous increase in vaginal sexual arousal may result in higher genital sensations and sexual appetitive behaviors.

Testosterone may prove to be an effective treatment in female sexual arousal disorders, and is available as a dermal patch. There is no FDA-approved androgen preparation for the treatment of androgen insufficiency; however, it has been used as an off-label use to treat low libido and sexual dysfunction in older women. Testosterone may be a treatment for postmenopausal women as long as they are effectively estrogenized.

==== Romantic relationships ====
Falling in love has been linked with decreases in men's testosterone levels while mixed changes are reported for women's testosterone levels. There has been speculation that these changes in testosterone result in the temporary reduction of differences in behavior between the sexes. However, the testosterone changes observed do not seem to be maintained as relationships develop over time.

Men who produce less testosterone are more likely to be in a relationship or married, and men who produce more testosterone are more likely to divorce. Marriage or commitment could cause a decrease in testosterone levels. Single men who have not had relationship experience have lower testosterone levels than single men with experience. These single men with prior experience may be in a more competitive state than their non-experienced counterparts. Married men who engage in bond-maintenance activities such as spending the day with their spouse or child have no different testosterone levels compared to times when they do not engage in such activities. Collectively, these results suggest that the presence of competitive activities rather than bond-maintenance activities is more relevant to changes in testosterone levels.

Men who produce more testosterone are more likely to engage in extramarital sex. Testosterone levels do not rely on physical presence of a partner; testosterone levels of men engaging in same-city and long-distance relationships are similar. Physical presence may be required for women who are in relationships for the testosterone–partner interaction, where same-city partnered women have lower testosterone levels than long-distance partnered women.

==== Fatherhood ====
Fatherhood decreases testosterone levels in men, suggesting that the emotions and behavior tied to paternal care decrease testosterone levels. In humans and other species that use allomaternal care, paternal investment in offspring is beneficial to said offspring's survival because it allows the two parents to raise multiple children simultaneously. This increases the reproductive fitness of the parents because their offspring are more likely to survive and reproduce. Paternal care increases offspring survival due to increased access to higher quality food and reduced physical and immunological threats. This is particularly beneficial for humans since offspring are dependent on parents for extended periods of time and mothers have relatively short inter-birth intervals.

While the extent of paternal care varies between cultures, higher investment in direct child care has been seen to be correlated with lower average testosterone levels as well as temporary fluctuations. For instance, fluctuation in testosterone levels when a child is in distress has been found to be indicative of fathering styles. If a father's testosterone levels decrease in response to hearing their baby cry, it is an indication of empathizing with the baby. This response is associated with increased nurturing behavior and better outcomes for the infant.

==== Motivation ====
Testosterone levels play a major role in risk-taking during financial decisions. Higher testosterone levels in men reduce the risk of becoming or staying unemployed. Research has also found that heightened levels of testosterone and cortisol are associated with an increased risk of impulsive and violent criminal behavior. On the other hand, elevated testosterone in men may increase their generosity, primarily to attract a potential mate.

==== Aggression and criminality ====
Most studies support a link between adult criminality and testosterone. Nearly all studies of juvenile delinquency and testosterone are not significant. Most studies have found testosterone to be associated with behaviors or personality traits linked with antisocial behavior and alcoholism. Many studies have been undertaken on the relationship between more general aggressive behavior, and feelings, and testosterone. About half of studies have found a relationship and about half, no relationship. Studies have found that testosterone facilitates aggression by modulating vasopressin receptors in the hypothalamus.

There are two theories on the role of testosterone in aggression and competition. The first is the challenge hypothesis which states that testosterone would increase during puberty, thus facilitating reproductive and competitive behavior which would include aggression. It is therefore the challenge of competition among males that facilitates aggression and violence. Studies conducted have found direct correlation between testosterone and dominance, especially among the most violent criminals in prison who had the highest testosterone. The same research found fathers (outside competitive environments) had the lowest testosterone levels compared to other males.

The second theory is similar and known as "evolutionary neuroandrogenic (ENA) theory of male aggression". Testosterone and other androgens have evolved to motivate men to pursue competition, even when doing so leads to risk. By doing so, individuals with masculinized brains are better able to survive and copulate with as many mates as possible. The masculinization of the brain is mediated both by testosterone levels at the adult stage and by testosterone exposure in the womb. Higher pre-natal testosterone indicated by a low digit ratio as well as adult testosterone levels increased risk of fouls or aggression among male players in a soccer game. Studies have found higher pre-natal testosterone or lower digit ratio to be correlated with higher aggression.

The rise in testosterone during competition predicted aggression in males, but not in females. In one experiment, subjects who interacted with handguns showed higher testosterone levels and aggression than those who interacted with toys. One study proposed that natural selection may have caused men to be more sensitive to situations in which their status is challenged, and that testosterone is the key factor that causes these situations to spark into aggression. Structural brain characteristics associated with testosterone levels have also been found to predict individuals' levels of aggression.

The Annals of the New York Academy of Sciences has found that the use of anabolic steroids (which increases testosterone) among teenagers is correlated with increased likelihood of using violence. One study found that administering testosterone increased verbal aggression in some participants.

A few studies indicate that the testosterone derivative estradiol might play an important role in male aggression. Estradiol is known to correlate with aggression in male mice. Moreover, the conversion of testosterone to estradiol regulates male aggression in sparrows during breeding season. Rats who were given anabolic steroids that increase testosterone were also more physically aggressive to provocation as a result of "threat sensitivity".

The relationship between testosterone and aggression may also function indirectly, as it has been proposed that testosterone does not amplify tendencies towards aggression, but rather amplifies whatever tendencies will allow an individual to maintain social status when challenged. In most animals, aggression is the means of maintaining social status. However, humans have multiple ways of obtaining status. This diversity could explain why some studies find a link between testosterone and pro-social behavior, if pro-social behavior is rewarded with social status. Thus the link between testosterone and aggression and violence is due to these being rewarded with social status. The relationship may also be one of a "permissive effect" whereby testosterone does elevate aggression levels, but only in the sense of allowing average aggression levels to be maintained; chemically or physically castrating the individual will reduce aggression levels (though not eliminate them) but the individual only needs a small-level of pre-castration testosterone to have aggression levels to return to normal, which they will remain at even if additional testosterone is added. Testosterone may also simply exaggerate or amplify existing aggression; for example, chimpanzees who receive testosterone increases become more aggressive to chimps lower than them in the social hierarchy, but will still be submissive to chimps higher than them. Testosterone thus does not make the chimpanzee indiscriminately aggressive, but instead amplifies his pre-existing aggression towards lower-ranked chimps.

In humans, testosterone appears more to promote status-seeking and social dominance than simply increasing physical aggression. When controlling for the effects of belief in having received testosterone, women who have received testosterone make fairer offers than women who have not received testosterone.

==== Fairness ====
Testosterone might encourage fair behavior. For one study, subjects took part in a behavioral experiment where the distribution of a real amount of money was decided. The rules allowed both fair and unfair offers. The negotiating partner could subsequently accept or decline the offer. The fairer the offer, the less probable a refusal by the negotiating partner. If no agreement was reached, neither party earned anything. Test subjects with an artificially enhanced testosterone level generally made better, fairer offers than those who received placebos, thus reducing the risk of a rejection of their offer to a minimum. Two later studies have empirically confirmed these results. However men with high testosterone were significantly 27% less generous in an ultimatum game. This additional information could suggest, contrarily, that testosterone may encourage greed or selfishness. Fairer offers from test subjects with higher testosterone in the original study increase the likeliness of the offer being accepted by the negotiating partner, therefore decreasing the probability of both participants leaving without any money.

== Biological activity ==
=== Free testosterone ===
Lipophilic hormones (soluble in lipids but not in water), such as steroid hormones, including testosterone, are transported in water-based blood plasma through specific and non-specific proteins. Specific proteins include sex hormone-binding globulin (SHBG), which binds testosterone, dihydrotestosterone, estradiol, and other sex steroids. Non-specific binding proteins include albumin. The part of the total hormone concentration that is not bound to its respective specific carrier protein is the free part. As a result, testosterone which is not bound to SHBG is called free testosterone. Only the free amount of testosterone can bind to an androgenic receptor, which means it has biological activity. While a significant portion of testosterone is bound to SHBG, a small fraction of testosterone (1%-2%) is bound to albumin and the binding of testosterone to albumin is weak and can be reversed easily; as such, both albumin-bound and unbound testosterone are considered to be bioavailable testosterone. This binding plays an important role in regulating the transport, tissue delivery, bioactivity, and metabolism of testosterone. At the tissue level, testosterone dissociates from albumin and quickly diffuses into the tissues. The percentage of testosterone bound to SHBG is lower in men than in women. Both the free fraction and the one bound to albumin are available at the tissue level (their sum constitutes the bioavailable testosterone), while SHBG effectively and irreversibly inhibits the action of testosterone. The relationship between sex steroids and SHBG in physiological and pathological conditions is complex, as various factors may influence the levels of plasma SHBG, affecting bioavailability of testosterone.

=== Steroid hormone activity ===
The effects of testosterone in humans and other vertebrates occur by way of multiple mechanisms: by activation of the androgen receptor (directly or as dihydrotestosterone), and by conversion to estradiol and activation of certain estrogen receptors. Androgens such as testosterone have also been found to bind to and activate membrane androgen receptors.

Free testosterone (T) is transported into the cytoplasm of target tissue cells, where it can bind to the androgen receptor, or can be reduced to 5α-dihydrotestosterone (5α-DHT) by the cytoplasmic enzyme 5α-reductase. 5α-DHT binds to the same androgen receptor even more strongly than testosterone, so that its androgenic potency is about 5 times that of T. The T-receptor or DHT-receptor complex undergoes a structural change that allows it to move into the cell nucleus and bind directly to specific nucleotide sequences of the chromosomal DNA. The areas of binding are called hormone response elements (HREs), and influence transcriptional activity of certain genes, producing the androgen effects.

Androgen receptors occur in many different vertebrate body system tissues, and both males and females respond similarly to similar levels. Greatly differing amounts of testosterone prenatally, at puberty, and throughout life account for a share of biological differences between males and females.

The bones and the brain are two important tissues in humans where the primary effect of testosterone is by way of aromatization to estradiol. In the bones, estradiol accelerates ossification of cartilage into bone, leading to closure of the epiphyses and conclusion of growth. In the central nervous system, testosterone is aromatized to estradiol. Estradiol rather than testosterone is the most important feedback signal to the hypothalamus (especially affecting LH secretion). In many mammals, prenatal or perinatal "masculinization" of the sexually dimorphic areas of the brain by estradiol derived from testosterone programs later male sexual behavior.

=== Neurosteroid activity ===
Testosterone, via its active metabolite 3α-androstanediol, is a potent positive allosteric modulator of the GABA_{A} receptor.

Testosterone has been found to act as an antagonist of the TrkA and p75^{NTR}, receptors for the neurotrophin nerve growth factor (NGF), with high affinity (around 5 nM). In contrast to testosterone, DHEA and DHEA sulfate have been found to act as high-affinity agonists of these receptors.

Testosterone is an antagonist of the sigma-1 receptor (K_{i} = 1,014 or 201 nM). However, the concentrations of testosterone required for binding the receptor are far above even total circulating concentrations of testosterone in adult males (which range between 10 and 35 nM).

== Biochemistry ==
Figure 1: Human steroidogenesis, showing testosterone near bottom

=== Biosynthesis ===
Like other steroid hormones, testosterone is derived from cholesterol. The first step in the biosynthesis involves the oxidative cleavage of the side-chain of cholesterol by cholesterol side-chain cleavage enzyme (P450scc, CYP11A1), a mitochondrial cytochrome P450 oxidase with the loss of six carbon atoms to give pregnenolone. In the next step, two additional carbon atoms are removed by the CYP17A1 (17α-hydroxylase/17,20-lyase) enzyme in the endoplasmic reticulum to yield a variety of C_{19} steroids. In addition, the 3β-hydroxyl group is oxidized by 3β-hydroxysteroid dehydrogenase to produce androstenedione. In the final and rate limiting step, the C17 keto group androstenedione is reduced by 17β-hydroxysteroid dehydrogenase to yield testosterone.

The largest amounts of testosterone (>95%) are produced by the testes in men, while the adrenal glands account for most of the remainder. Testosterone is also synthesized in far smaller total quantities in women by the adrenal glands, thecal cells of the ovaries, and, during pregnancy, by the placenta. In the testes, testosterone is produced by the Leydig cells. The male generative glands also contain Sertoli cells, which require testosterone for spermatogenesis. Like most hormones, testosterone is supplied to target tissues in the blood where much of it is transported bound to a specific plasma protein, sex hormone-binding globulin (SHBG).

Production rates, secretion rates, clearance rates, and blood levels of major sex hormones
Sex	Sex hormone	Reproductive phase	Blood production rate	Gonadal secretion rate	Metabolic clearance rate	Reference range (serum levels)	
Sex	Sex hormone	Reproductive phase	Blood production rate	Gonadal secretion rate	Metabolic clearance rate	Molar concentration	Mass concentration
Men	Androstenedione	–	2.8 mg/day	1.6 mg/day	2200 L/day	2.8–7.3 nmol/L	80–210 ng/dL
Men	Testosterone	–	6.5 mg/day	6.2 mg/day	950 L/day	6.9–34.7 nmol/L	200–1000 ng/dL
Men	Estrone	–	150 μg/day	110 μg/day	2050 L/day	37–250 pmol/L	10–70 pg/mL
Men	Estradiol	–	60 μg/day	50 μg/day	1600 L/day	<37–210 pmol/L	10–57 pg/mL
Men	Estrone sulfate	–	80 μg/day	Insignificant	167 L/day	600–2500 pmol/L	200–900 pg/mL
Women	Androstenedione	–	3.2 mg/day	2.8 mg/day	2000 L/day	3.1–12.2 nmol/L	89–350 ng/dL
Women	Testosterone	–	190 μg/day	60 μg/day	500 L/day	0.7–2.8 nmol/L	20–81 ng/dL
Women	Estrone	Follicular phase	110 μg/day	80 μg/day	2200 L/day	110–400 pmol/L	30–110 pg/mL
Women	Estrone	Luteal phase	260 μg/day	150 μg/day	2200 L/day	310–660 pmol/L	80–180 pg/mL
Women	Estrone	Postmenopause	40 μg/day	Insignificant	1610 L/day	22–230 pmol/L	6–60 pg/mL
Women	Estradiol	Follicular phase	90 μg/day	80 μg/day	1200 L/day	<37–360 pmol/L	10–98 pg/mL
Women	Estradiol	Luteal phase	250 μg/day	240 μg/day	1200 L/day	699–1250 pmol/L	190–341 pg/mL
Women	Estradiol	Postmenopause	6 μg/day	Insignificant	910 L/day	<37–140 pmol/L	10–38 pg/mL
Women	Estrone sulfate	Follicular phase	100 μg/day	Insignificant	146 L/day	700–3600 pmol/L	250–1300 pg/mL
Women	Estrone sulfate	Luteal phase	180 μg/day	Insignificant	146 L/day	1100–7300 pmol/L	400–2600 pg/mL
Women	Progesterone	Follicular phase	2 mg/day	1.7 mg/day	2100 L/day	0.3–3 nmol/L	0.1–0.9 ng/mL
Women	Progesterone	Luteal phase	25 mg/day	24 mg/day	2100 L/day	19–45 nmol/L	6–14 ng/mL
Notes and sources Notes: "The concentration of a steroid in the circulation is determined by the rate at which it is secreted from glands, the rate of metabolism of precursor or prehormones into the steroid, and the rate at which it is extracted by tissues and metabolized. The secretion rate of a steroid refers to the total secretion of the compound from a gland per unit time. Secretion rates have been assessed by sampling the venous effluent from a gland over time and subtracting out the arterial and peripheral venous hormone concentration. The metabolic clearance rate of a steroid is defined as the volume of blood that has been completely cleared of the hormone per unit time. The production rate of a steroid hormone refers to entry into the blood of the compound from all possible sources, including secretion from glands and conversion of prohormones into the steroid of interest. At steady state, the amount of hormone entering the blood from all sources will be equal to the rate at which it is being cleared (metabolic clearance rate) multiplied by blood concentration (production rate = metabolic clearance rate × concentration). If there is little contribution of prohormone metabolism to the circulating pool of steroid, then the production rate will approximate the secretion rate." Sources: See template.

==== Regulation ====
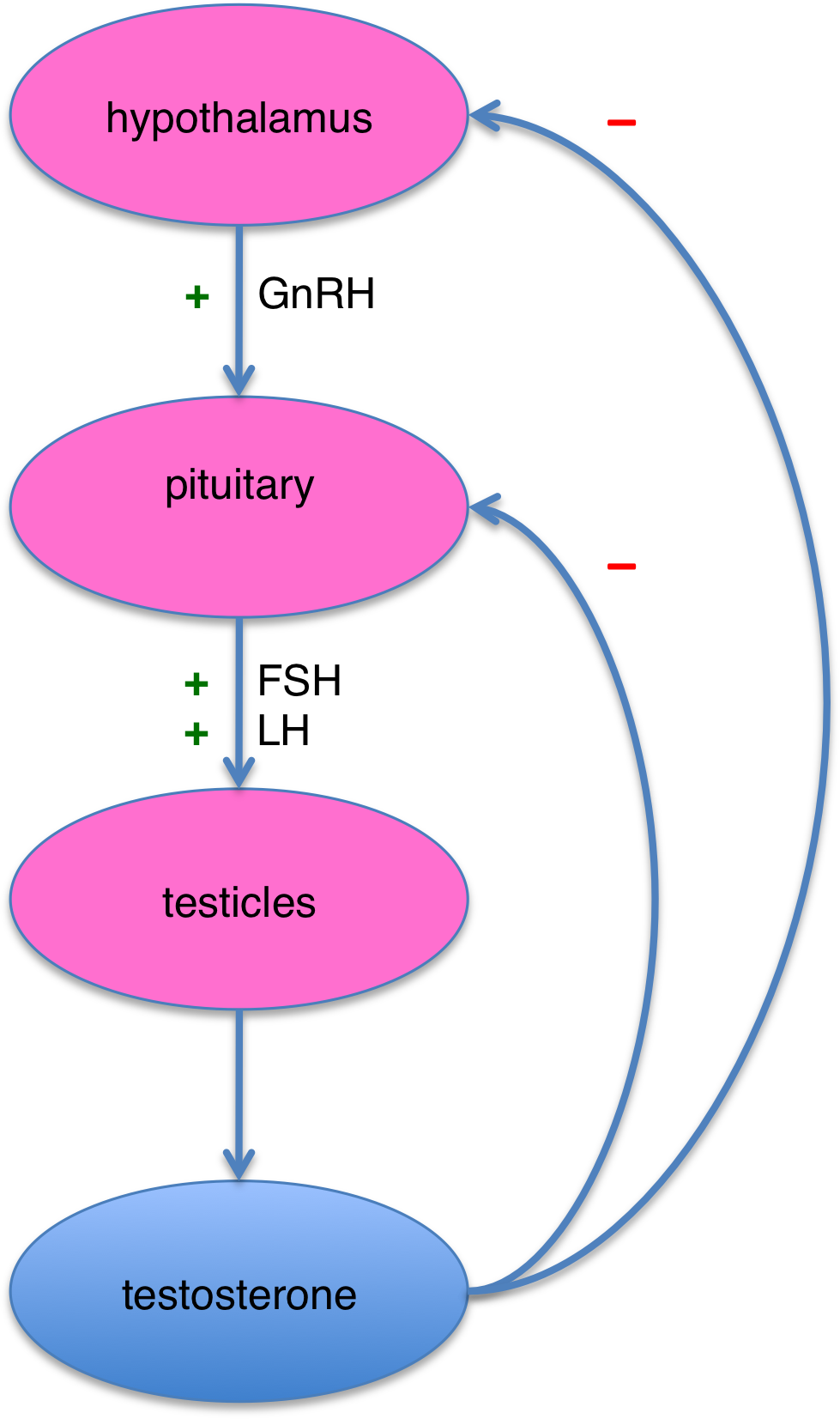
Figure 2. Hypothalamic–pituitary–testicular axis

In males, testosterone is synthesized primarily in Leydig cells. The number of Leydig cells in turn is regulated by luteinizing hormone (LH) and follicle-stimulating hormone (FSH). In addition, the amount of testosterone produced by existing Leydig cells is under the control of LH, which regulates the expression of 17β-hydroxysteroid dehydrogenase.

The amount of testosterone synthesized is regulated by the hypothalamic–pituitary–testicular axis. When testosterone levels are low, gonadotropin-releasing hormone (GnRH) is released by the hypothalamus, which in turn stimulates the pituitary gland to release FSH and LH. These latter two hormones stimulate the testis to synthesize testosterone. Finally, increasing levels of testosterone through a negative feedback loop act on the hypothalamus and pituitary to inhibit the release of GnRH and FSH/LH, respectively.

Factors affecting testosterone levels may include:

- Age: Testosterone levels gradually reduce as men age. This effect is sometimes referred to as andropause or late-onset hypogonadism.
- Exercise: Resistance training increases testosterone levels acutely, however, in older men, that increase can be avoided by protein ingestion. Endurance training in men may lead to lower testosterone levels.
- Nutrients: Vitamin A deficiency may lead to sub-optimal plasma testosterone levels. The secosteroid vitamin D in levels of 400–1000 IU/d (10–25 μg/d) raises testosterone levels. Zinc deficiency lowers testosterone levels but over-supplementation has no effect on serum testosterone. There is limited evidence that low-fat diets may reduce total and free testosterone levels in men.
- Weight loss: Reduction in weight may result in an increase in testosterone levels. Fat cells synthesize the enzyme aromatase, which converts testosterone, the male sex hormone, into estradiol, the female sex hormone. However no clear association between body mass index and testosterone levels has been found.
- Miscellaneous: Sleep: (REM sleep) increases nocturnal testosterone levels.
- Behavior: Dominance challenges can, in some cases, stimulate increased testosterone release in men.
- Foods: Natural or man-made antiandrogens including spearmint tea reduce testosterone levels. Licorice can decrease the production of testosterone and this effect is greater in females.

=== Distribution ===
The plasma protein binding of testosterone is 98.0 to 98.5%, with 1.5 to 2.0% free or unbound. It is bound 65% to sex hormone-binding globulin (SHBG) and 33% bound weakly to albumin.

Plasma protein binding of testosterone and dihydrotestosterone
Compound	Group	Level (nM)	Free (%)	SHBG (%)	CBG (%)	Albumin (%)
Testosterone	Adult men	23.0	2.23	44.3	3.56	49.9
Testosterone	Adult women					
Testosterone	Follicular phase	1.3	1.36	66.0	2.26	30.4
Testosterone	Luteal phase	1.3	1.37	65.7	2.20	30.7
Testosterone	Pregnancy	4.7	0.23	95.4	0.82	3.6
Dihydrotestosterone	Adult men	1.70	0.88	49.7	0.22	39.2
Dihydrotestosterone	Adult women					
Dihydrotestosterone	Follicular phase	0.65	0.47	78.4	0.12	21.0
Dihydrotestosterone	Luteal phase	0.65	0.48	78.1	0.12	21.3
Dihydrotestosterone	Pregnancy	0.93	0.07	97.8	0.04	21.2
Sources: See template.

=== Metabolism ===
Testosterone metabolism in humans
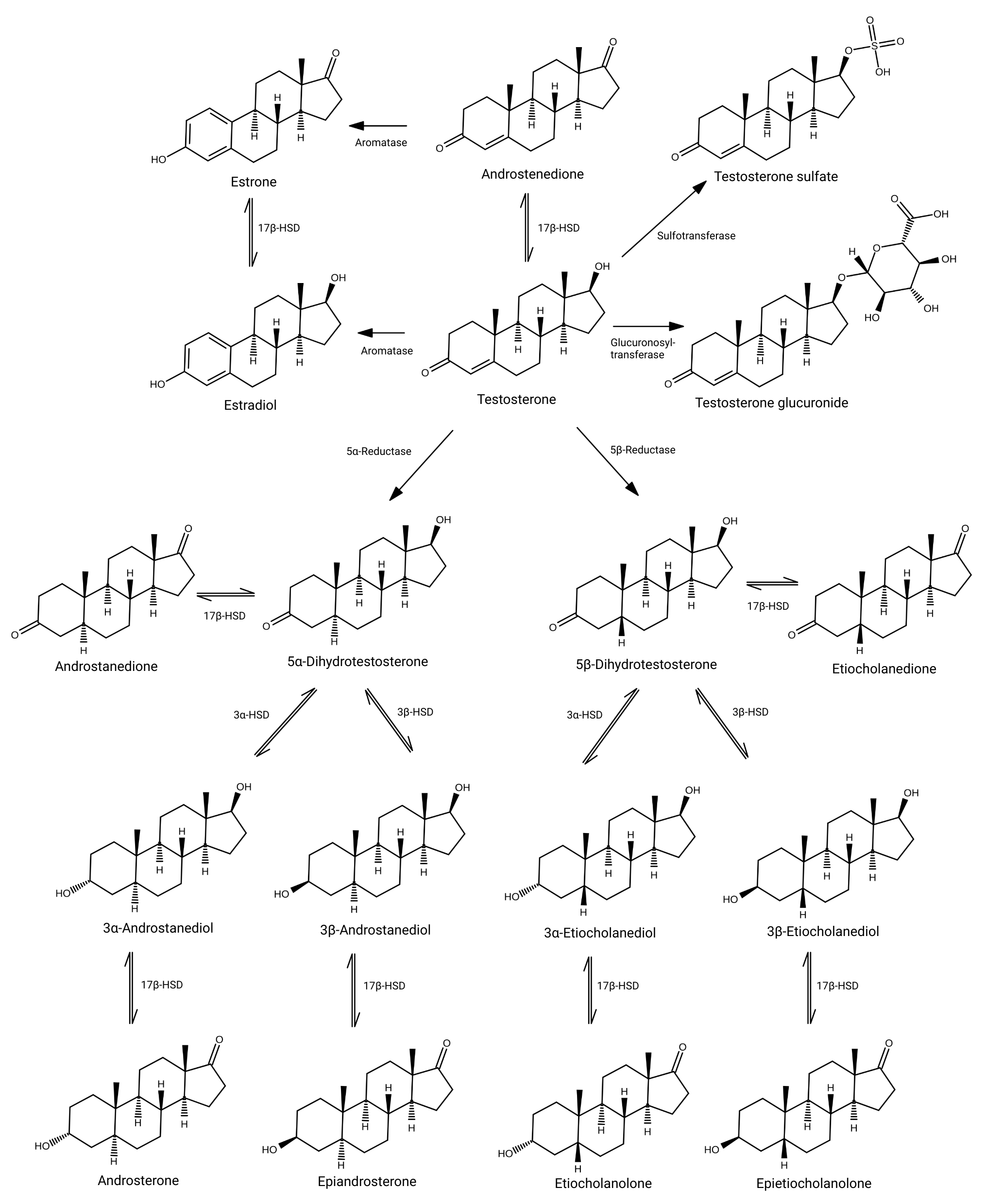
The metabolic pathways involved in the metabolism of testosterone in humans. In addition to the transformations shown in the diagram, conjugation via sulfation and glucuronidation occurs with testosterone and metabolites that have one or more available hydroxyl (–OH) groups.

Both testosterone and 5α-DHT are metabolized mainly in the liver. Approximately 50% of testosterone is metabolized via conjugation into testosterone glucuronide and to a lesser extent testosterone sulfate by glucuronosyltransferases and sulfotransferases, respectively. An additional 40% of testosterone is metabolized in equal proportions into the 17-ketosteroids androsterone and etiocholanolone via the combined actions of 5α- and 5β-reductases, 3α-hydroxysteroid dehydrogenase, and 17β-HSD, in that order. Androsterone and etiocholanolone are then glucuronidated and to a lesser extent sulfated similarly to testosterone. The conjugates of testosterone and its hepatic metabolites are released from the liver into circulation and excreted in the urine and bile. Only a small fraction (2%) of testosterone is excreted unchanged in the urine.

In the hepatic 17-ketosteroid pathway of testosterone metabolism, testosterone is converted in the liver by 5α-reductase and 5β-reductase into 5α-DHT and the inactive 5β-DHT, respectively. Then, 5α-DHT and 5β-DHT are converted by 3α-HSD into 3α-androstanediol and 3α-etiocholanediol, respectively. Subsequently, 3α-androstanediol and 3α-etiocholanediol are converted by 17β-HSD into androsterone and etiocholanolone, which is followed by their conjugation and excretion. 3β-Androstanediol and 3β-etiocholanediol can also be formed in this pathway when 5α-DHT and 5β-DHT are acted upon by 3β-HSD instead of 3α-HSD, respectively, and they can then be transformed into epiandrosterone and epietiocholanolone, respectively. A small portion of approximately 3% of testosterone is reversibly converted in the liver into androstenedione by 17β-HSD.

In addition to conjugation and the 17-ketosteroid pathway, testosterone can also be hydroxylated and oxidized in the liver by cytochrome P450 enzymes, including CYP3A4, CYP3A5, CYP2C9, CYP2C19, and CYP2D6. 6β-Hydroxylation and to a lesser extent 16β-hydroxylation are the major transformations. The 6β-hydroxylation of testosterone is catalyzed mainly by CYP3A4 and to a lesser extent CYP3A5 and is responsible for 75 to 80% of cytochrome P450-mediated testosterone metabolism. In addition to 6β- and 16β-hydroxytestosterone, 1β-, 2α/β-, 11β-, and 15β-hydroxytestosterone are also formed as minor metabolites. Certain cytochrome P450 enzymes such as CYP2C9 and CYP2C19 can also oxidize testosterone at the C17 position to form androstenedione.

Two of the immediate metabolites of testosterone, 5α-DHT and estradiol, are biologically important and can be formed both in the liver and in extrahepatic tissues. Approximately 5 to 7% of testosterone is converted by 5α-reductase into 5α-DHT, with circulating levels of 5α-DHT about 10% of those of testosterone, and approximately 0.3% of testosterone is converted into estradiol by aromatase. 5α-Reductase is highly expressed in the male reproductive organs (including the prostate gland, seminal vesicles, and epididymides), skin, hair follicles, and brain and aromatase is highly expressed in adipose tissue, bone, and the brain. As much as 90% of testosterone is converted into 5α-DHT in so-called androgenic tissues with high 5α-reductase expression, and due to the several-fold greater potency of 5α-DHT as an AR agonist relative to testosterone, it has been estimated that the effects of testosterone are potentiated 2- to 3-fold in such tissues.

=== Levels ===
Total levels of testosterone in the body have been reported as 264 to 916 ng/dL (nanograms per deciliter) in non-obese European and American men age 19 to 39 years, while mean testosterone levels in adult men have been reported as 630 ng/dL. Although commonly used as a reference range, some physicians have disputed the use of this range to determine hypogonadism. Several professional medical groups have recommended that 350 ng/dL generally be considered the minimum normal level, which is consistent with previous findings. Levels of testosterone in men decline with age. In women, mean levels of total testosterone have been reported to be 32.6 ng/dL. In women with hyperandrogenism, mean levels of total testosterone have been reported to be 62.1 ng/dL.

Testosterone levels in males and females
Total testosterone
Stage	Age range	Male		Female	
Stage	Age range	Values	SI units	Values	SI units
Infant	Premature (26–28 weeks)	59–125 ng/dL	2.047–4.337 nmol/L	5–16 ng/dL	0.173–0.555 nmol/L
Infant	Premature (31–35 weeks)	37–198 ng/dL	1.284–6.871 nmol/L	5–22 ng/dL	0.173–0.763 nmol/L
Infant	Newborn	75–400 ng/dL	2.602–13.877 nmol/L	20–64 ng/dL	0.694–2.220 nmol/L
Child	1–6 years	ND	ND	ND	ND
Child	7–9 years	0–8 ng/dL	0–0.277 nmol/L	1–12 ng/dL	0.035–0.416 nmol/L
Child	Just before puberty	3–10 ng/dL*	0.104–0.347 nmol/L*	<10 ng/dL*	<0.347 nmol/L*
Puberty	10–11 years	1–48 ng/dL	0.035–1.666 nmol/L	2–35 ng/dL	0.069–1.214 nmol/L
Puberty	12–13 years	5–619 ng/dL	0.173–21.480 nmol/L	5–53 ng/dL	0.173–1.839 nmol/L
Puberty	14–15 years	100–320 ng/dL	3.47–11.10 nmol/L	8–41 ng/dL	0.278–1.423 nmol/L
Puberty	16–17 years	200–970 ng/dL*	6.94–33.66 nmol/L*	8–53 ng/dL	0.278–1.839 nmol/L
Adult	≥18 years	350–1080 ng/dL*	12.15–37.48 nmol/L*	–	–
Adult	20–39 years	400–1080 ng/dL	13.88–37.48 nmol/L	–	–
Adult	40–59 years	350–890 ng/dL	12.15–30.88 nmol/L	–	–
Adult	≥60 years	350–720 ng/dL	12.15–24.98 nmol/L	–	–
Adult	Premenopausal	–	–	10–54 ng/dL	0.347–1.873 nmol/L
Adult	Postmenopausal	–	–	7–40 ng/dL	0.243–1.388 nmol/L
Bioavailable testosterone
Stage	Age range	Male		Female	
Stage	Age range	Values	SI units	Values	SI units
Child	1–6 years	0.2–1.3 ng/dL	0.007–0.045 nmol/L	0.2–1.3 ng/dL	0.007–0.045 nmol/L
Child	7–9 years	0.2–2.3 ng/dL	0.007–0.079 nmol/L	0.2–4.2 ng/dL	0.007–0.146 nmol/L
Puberty	10–11 years	0.2–14.8 ng/dL	0.007–0.513 nmol/L	0.4–19.3 ng/dL	0.014–0.670 nmol/L
Puberty	12–13 years	0.3–232.8 ng/dL	0.010–8.082 nmol/L	1.1–15.6 ng/dL	0.038–0.541 nmol/L
Puberty	14–15 years	7.9–274.5 ng/dL	0.274–9.525 nmol/L	2.5–18.8 ng/dL	0.087–0.652 nmol/L
Puberty	16–17 years	24.1–416.5 ng/dL	0.836–14.452 nmol/L	2.7–23.8 ng/dL	0.094–0.826 nmol/L
Adult	≥18 years	ND	ND	–	–
Adult	Premenopausal	–	–	1.9–22.8 ng/dL	0.066–0.791 nmol/L
Adult	Postmenopausal	–	–	1.6–19.1 ng/dL	0.055–0.662 nmol/L
Free testosterone
Stage	Age range	Male		Female	
Stage	Age range	Values	SI units	Values	SI units
Child	1–6 years	0.1–0.6 pg/mL	0.3–2.1 pmol/L	0.1–0.6 pg/mL	0.3–2.1 pmol/L
Child	7–9 years	0.1–0.8 pg/mL	0.3–2.8 pmol/L	0.1–1.6 pg/mL	0.3–5.6 pmol/L
Puberty	10–11 years	0.1–5.2 pg/mL	0.3–18.0 pmol/L	0.1–2.9 pg/mL	0.3–10.1 pmol/L
Puberty	12–13 years	0.4–79.6 pg/mL	1.4–276.2 pmol/L	0.6–5.6 pg/mL	2.1–19.4 pmol/L
Puberty	14–15 years	2.7–112.3 pg/mL	9.4–389.7 pmol/L	1.0–6.2 pg/mL	3.5–21.5 pmol/L
Puberty	16–17 years	31.5–159 pg/mL	109.3–551.7 pmol/L	1.0–8.3 pg/mL	3.5–28.8 pmol/L
Adult	≥18 years	44–244 pg/mL	153–847 pmol/L	–	–
Adult	Premenopausal	–	–	0.8–9.2 pg/mL	2.8–31.9 pmol/L
Adult	Postmenopausal	–	–	0.6–6.7 pg/mL	2.1–23.2 pmol/L
Sources: See template.

Total testosterone levels in males throughout life
Life stage	Tanner stage	Age range	Mean age	Levels range	Mean levels
Child	Stage I	<10 years	–	<30 ng/dL	5.8 ng/dL
Puberty	Stage II	10–14 years	12 years	<167 ng/dL	40 ng/dL
Puberty	Stage III	12–16 years	13–14 years	21–719 ng/dL	190 ng/dL
Puberty	Stage IV	13–17 years	14–15 years	25–912 ng/dL	370 ng/dL
Puberty	Stage V	13–17 years	15 years	110–975 ng/dL	550 ng/dL
Adult	–	≥18 years	–	250–1,100 ng/dL	630 ng/dL

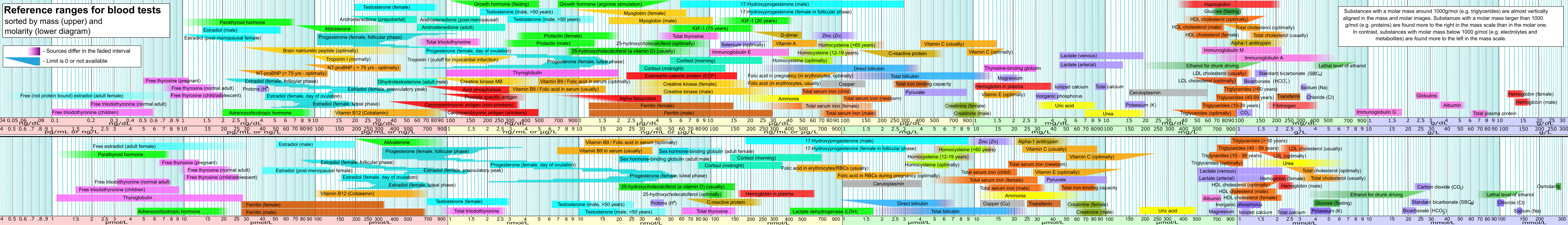
Reference ranges for blood tests, showing adult male testosterone levels in light blue at center-left

== Measurement ==
In measurements of testosterone in blood samples, different assay techniques can yield different results. Immunofluorescence assays exhibit considerable variability in quantifying testosterone concentrations in blood samples due to the cross-reaction of structurally similar steroids, leading to overestimating the results. In contrast, the liquid chromatography/tandem mass spectrometry method is more desirable: it offers superior specificity and precision, making it a more suitable choice for this application.

Testosterone's bioavailable concentration is commonly determined using the Vermeulen calculation or more precisely using the modified Vermeulen method, which considers the dimeric form of sex hormone-binding globulin.

Both methods use chemical equilibrium to derive the concentration of bioavailable testosterone: in circulation, testosterone has two major binding partners, albumin (weakly bound) and sex hormone-binding globulin (strongly bound). These methods are described in detail in the accompanying figure.

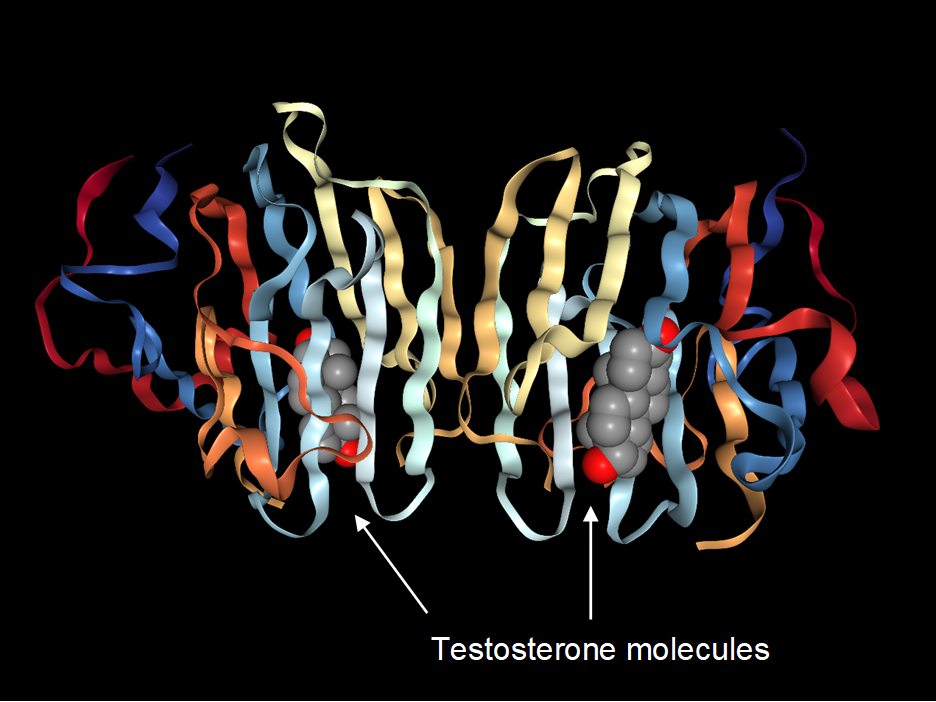
Dimeric sex hormone-binding globulin with its testosterone ligands

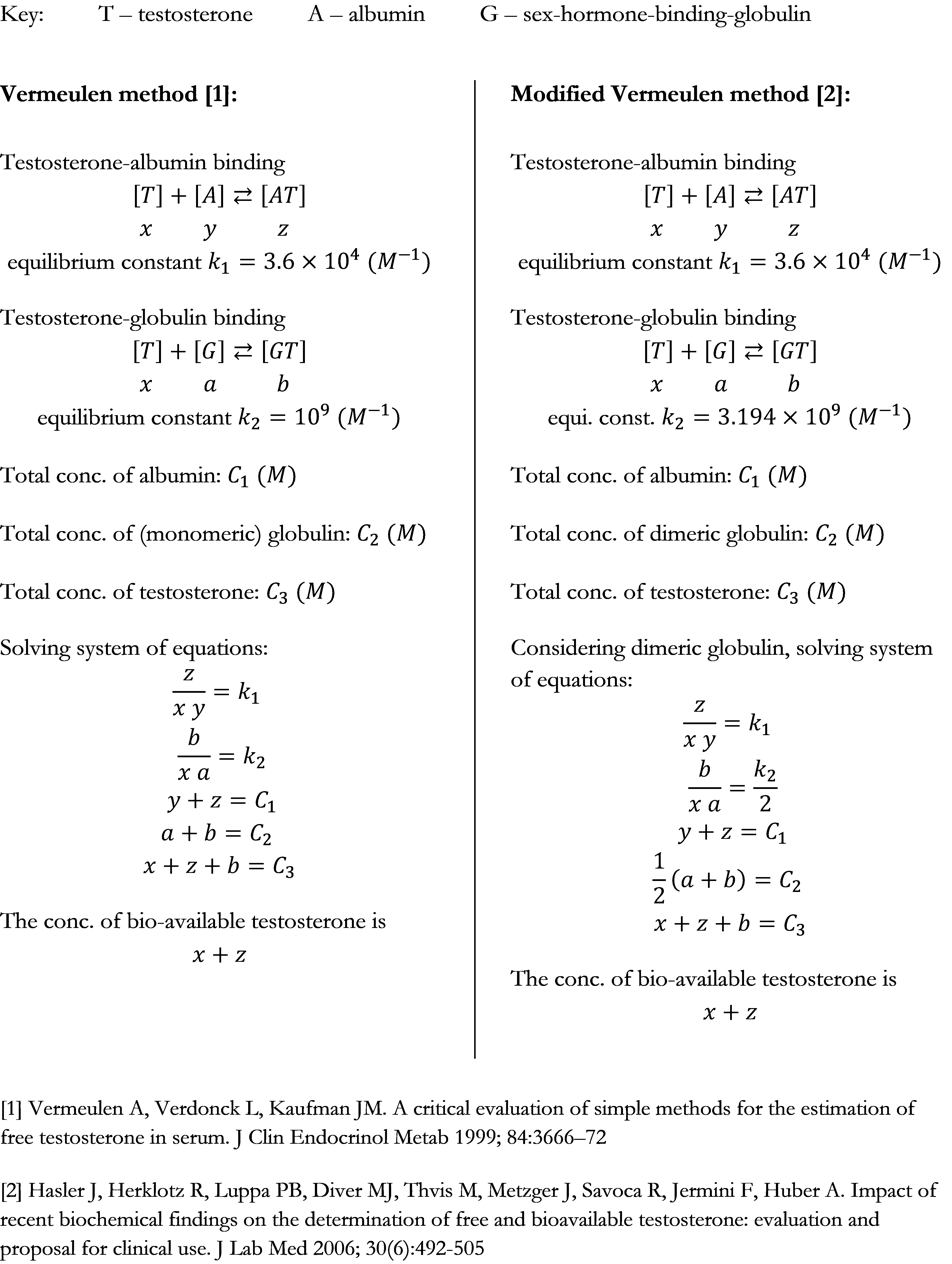
Two methods for determining the concentration of bioavailable testosterone

== Distribution ==
Testosterone has been detected at variably higher and lower levels among men of various nations and from various backgrounds, explanations for the causes of this have been relatively diverse.

== History and production ==
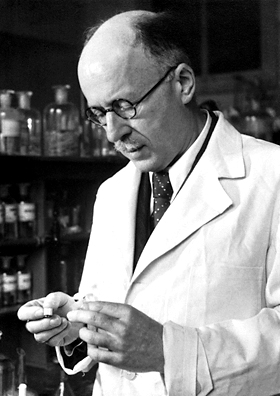
Nobel Prize winner, Leopold Ružička of Ciba, a pharmaceutical industry giant that synthesized testosterone

A testicular action was linked to circulating blood fractions – now understood to be a family of androgenic hormones – in the early work on castration and testicular transplantation in fowl by Arnold Adolph Berthold (1803–1861). Research on the action of testosterone received a brief boost in 1889, when the Harvard professor Charles-Édouard Brown-Séquard (1817–1894), then in Paris, self-injected subcutaneously a "rejuvenating elixir" consisting of an extract of dog and guinea pig testicle. He reported in The Lancet that his vigor and feeling of well-being were markedly restored but the effects were transient, and Brown-Séquard's hopes for the compound were dashed. Suffering the ridicule of his colleagues, he abandoned his work on the mechanisms and effects of androgens in human beings.

In 1927, the University of Chicago's Professor of Physiologic Chemistry, Fred C. Koch, established easy access to a large source of bovine testicles – the Chicago stockyards – and recruited students willing to endure the tedious work of extracting their isolates. In that year, Koch and his student, Lemuel McGee, derived 20 mg of a substance from a supply of 40 pounds of bovine testicles that, when administered to castrated roosters, pigs and rats, re-masculinized them. The group of Ernst Laqueur at the University of Amsterdam purified testosterone from bovine testicles in a similar manner in 1934, but the isolation of the hormone from animal tissues in amounts permitting serious study in humans was not feasible until three European pharmaceutical giants – Schering (Berlin, Germany), Organon (Oss, Netherlands) and Ciba – began full-scale steroid research and development programs in the 1930s.

The Organon group in the Netherlands were the first to isolate the hormone, identified in a May 1935 paper "On Crystalline Male Hormone from Testicles (Testosterone)". They named the hormone testosterone, from the stems of testicle and sterol, and the suffix of ketone. The structure was worked out by Schering's Adolf Butenandt, at the Chemisches Institut of Technical University in Gdańsk.

The chemical synthesis of testosterone from cholesterol was achieved in August that year by Butenandt and Hanisch. Only a week later, the Ciba group in Zurich, Leopold Ruzicka (1887–1976) and A. Wettstein, published their synthesis of testosterone. These independent partial syntheses of testosterone from a cholesterol base earned both Butenandt and Ruzicka the joint 1939 Nobel Prize in Chemistry. Testosterone was identified as 17β-hydroxyandrost-4-en-3-one (C_{19}H_{28}O_{2}), a solid polycyclic alcohol with a hydroxyl group at the 17th carbon atom. This also made it obvious that additional modifications on the synthesized testosterone could be made, i.e., esterification and alkylation.

The partial synthesis in the 1930s of abundant, potent testosterone esters permitted the characterization of the hormone's effects, so that Kochakian and Murlin (1936) were able to show that testosterone raised nitrogen retention (a mechanism central to anabolism) in the dog, after which Allan Kenyon's group was able to demonstrate both anabolic and androgenic effects of testosterone propionate in eunuchoidal men, boys, and women. The period of the early 1930s to the 1950s has been called "The Golden Age of Steroid Chemistry", and work during this period progressed quickly.

Like other androsteroids, testosterone is manufactured industrially from microbial fermentation of plant cholesterol (e.g., from soybean oil). In the early 2000s, the steroid market weighed around one million tonnes and was worth $10 billion, making it the 2nd largest biopharmaceutical market behind antibiotics.

== Other species ==
Testosterone is observed in most vertebrates. Testosterone and the classical nuclear androgen receptor first appeared in gnathostomes (jawed vertebrates). Agnathans (jawless vertebrates) such as lampreys do not produce testosterone but instead use androstenedione as a male sex hormone. Fish make a slightly different form called 11-ketotestosterone. Its counterpart in insects is ecdysone. The presence of these ubiquitous steroids in a wide range of animals suggest that sex hormones have an ancient evolutionary history.

== See also ==
- List of androgens and anabolic steroids
- List of human hormones
