= Etiocholanedione =

Names
- IUPAC name 5β-Androstane-3,17-dione
- Systematic IUPAC name (3aS,3bR,5aR,9aS,9bS,11aS)-9a,11a-Dimethyltetradecahydro-1H-cyclopenta[a]phenanthrene-1,7(3bH)-dione
- Other names Etiocholane-3,17-dione; 5β-Androstanedione

Identifiers
CAS Number	1229-12-5
3D model (JSmol)	Interactive image
ChEBI	CHEBI:16985
ChEMBL	ChEMBL1230988
ChemSpider	389114
DrugBank	DB07375
KEGG	C03772
PubChem CID	440114
UNII	213MVW2TZD
CompTox Dashboard (EPA)	DTXSID10153778
- InChI: InChI=1S/C19H28O2/c1-18-9-7-13(20)11-12(18)3-4-14-15-5-6-17(21)19(15,2)10-8-16(14)18/h12,14-16H,3-11H2,1-2H3/t12-,14+,15+,16+,18+,19+/m1/s1 Key: RAJWOBJTTGJROA-QJISAEMRSA-N
- SMILES: C[C@]12CCC(=O)C[C@H]1CC[C@@H]3[C@@H]2CC[C@]4([C@H]3CCC4=O)C

Properties
Chemical formula	C_{19}H_{28}O_{2}
Molar mass	288.431 g/mol
- Except where otherwise noted, data are given for materials in their standard state (at 25 °C [77 °F], 100 kPa). Infobox references

Etiocholanedione, also known as 5β-androstanedione or as etiocholane-3,17-dione, is a naturally occurring etiocholane (5β-androstane) steroid and an endogenous metabolite of androgens like testosterone, dihydrotestosterone, dehydroepiandrosterone (DHEA), and androstenedione. It is the C5 epimer of androstanedione (5α-androstanedione). Although devoid of androgenic activity like other 5β-reduced steroids, etiocholanedione has some biological activity of its own. The compound has been found to possess potent haematopoietic effects in a variety of models. In addition, it has been found to promote weight loss in animals and in a double-blind, placebo-controlled clinical study in humans conducted in 1993. These effects are said to be similar to those of DHEA. Unlike DHEA however, etiocholanedione cannot be metabolized further into steroid hormones like androgens and estrogens.
