= Epietiocholanolone =

Names
- IUPAC name 3β-Hydroxy-5β-androstan-17-one
- Systematic IUPAC name (3aS,3bR,5aR,7S,9aS,9bS,11aS)-7-Hydroxy-9a,11a-dimethylhexadecahydro-1H-cyclopenta[a]phenanthren-1-one
- Other names 5β-Androstan-3β-ol-17-one; Etiocholan-3β-ol-17-one

Identifiers
CAS Number	571-31-3
3D model (JSmol)	Interactive image
ChEBI	CHEBI:89524
ChEMBL	ChEMBL260526
ChemSpider	216866
PubChem CID	247732
UNII	C1751JYC6P
CompTox Dashboard (EPA)	DTXSID601024073 DTXSID20289698, DTXSID601024073
- InChI: InChI=1S/C19H30O2/c1-18-9-7-13(20)11-12(18)3-4-14-15-5-6-17(21)19(15,2)10-8-16(14)18/h12-16,20H,3-11H2,1-2H3/t12-,13+,14+,15+,16+,18+,19+/m1/s1 Key: QGXBDMJGAMFCBF-XRJZGPCZSA-N
- SMILES: C[C@]12CC[C@@H](C[C@H]1CC[C@@H]3[C@@H]2CC[C@]4([C@H]3CCC4=O)C)O

Properties
Chemical formula	C_{19}H_{30}O_{2}
Molar mass	290.447 g·mol^{−1}
- Except where otherwise noted, data are given for materials in their standard state (at 25 °C [77 °F], 100 kPa). Infobox references

Epietiocholanolone, also known as 3β-hydroxy-5β-androstan-17-one or as etiocholan-3β-ol-17-one, is an etiocholane (5β-androstane) steroid as well as an inactive metabolite of testosterone that is formed in the liver. The metabolic pathway is testosterone to 5β-dihydrotestosterone (via 5β-reductase), 5β-dihydrotestosterone to 3β,5β-androstanediol (via 3β-hydroxysteroid dehydrogenase), and 3β,5β-androstanediol to epietiocholanolone (via 17β-hydroxysteroid dehydrogenase). Epietiocholanolone can also be formed directly from 5β-androstanedione (via 3β-hydroxysteroid dehydrogenase). It is glucuronidated and sulfated in the liver and excreted in urine.

== See also ==
- Androsterone
- Epiandrosterone
- Etiocholanolone
