= Etiocholanolone =

Chemical compound

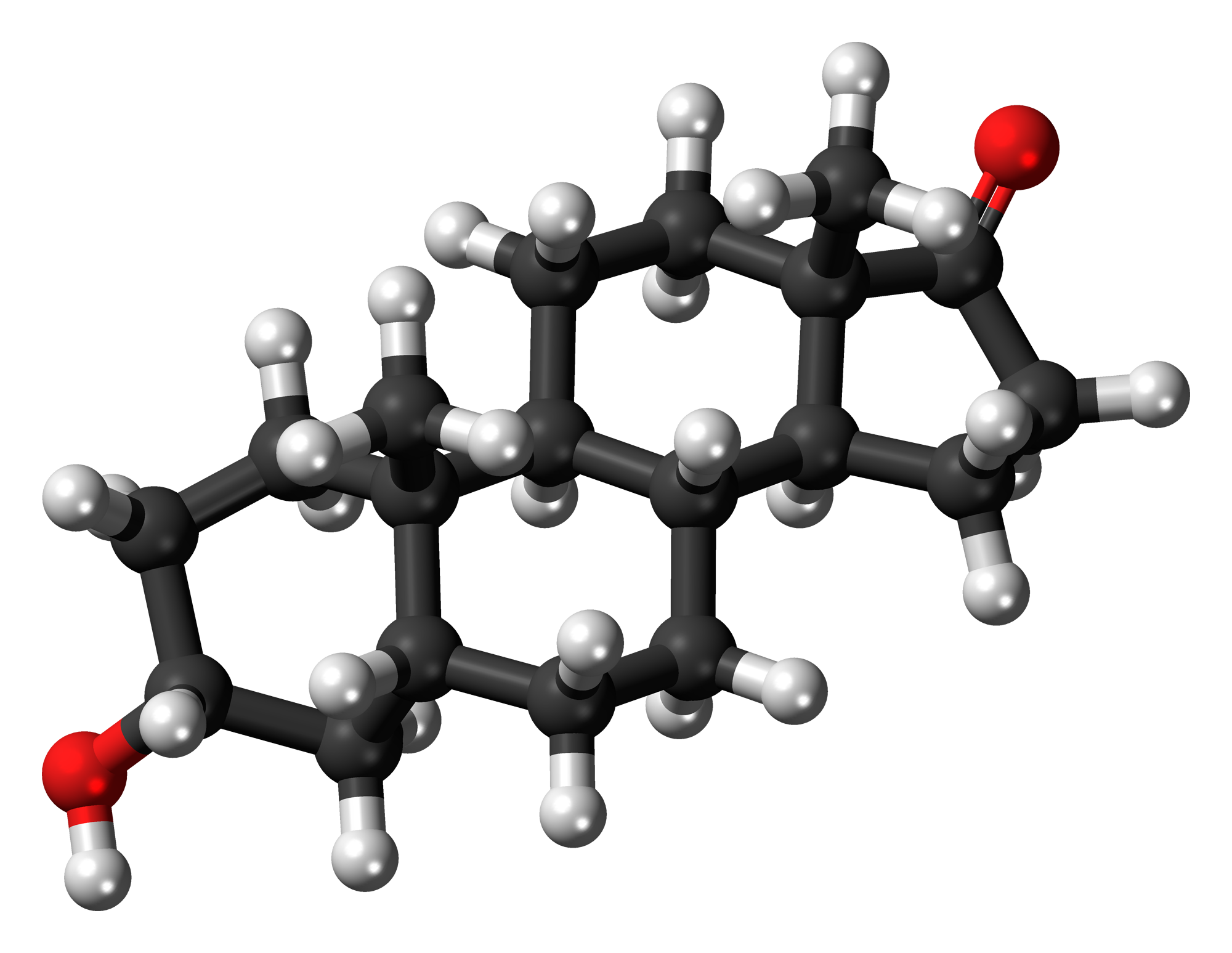

Clinical data
- Other names: Aetiocholanolone; 5-Isoandrosterone
- ATC code: none

Identifiers
- IUPAC name: (3R,5R,8R,9S,10S,13S,14S)-3-Hydroxy-10,13-dimethyl-1,2,3,4,5,6,7,8,9,11,12,14,15,16-tetradecahydrocyclopenta[a]phenanthren-17-one
- CAS Number: 53-42-9
- PubChem CID: 5880
- DrugBank: DB02854
- ChemSpider: 5669
- UNII: 97CGB1M48I
- ChEBI: CHEBI:28195
- ChEMBL: ChEMBL85799
- CompTox Dashboard (EPA): DTXSID001018919

Chemical and physical data
- Formula: C_{19}H_{30}O_{2}
- Molar mass: 290.447 g·mol^{−1}
- 3D model (JSmol): Interactive image
- SMILES: [H][C@]12CC[C@@]3([H])[C@]4([H])CCC(=O)[C@@]4(C)CC[C@]3([H])[C@@]1(C)CC[C@@H](O)C2
- InChI: InChI=1S/C19H30O2/c1-18-9-7-13(20)11-12(18)3-4-14-15-5-6-17(21)19(15,2)10-8-16(14)18/h12-16,20H,3-11H2,1-2H3/t12-,13-,14+,15+,16+,18+,19+/m1/s1; Key:QGXBDMJGAMFCBF-BNSUEQOYSA-N

Etiocholanolone, also known as 5β-androsterone, as well as 3α-hydroxy-5β-androstan-17-one or etiocholan-3α-ol-17-one, is an etiocholane (5β-androstane) steroid as well as an endogenous 17-ketosteroid that is produced from the metabolism of testosterone. It causes fever, immunostimulation, and leukocytosis, and is used to evaluate adrenal cortex function, bone marrow performance, and in neoplastic disease to stimulate the immune system. Etiocholanolone is also known to be an inhibitory androstane neurosteroid, acting as a positive allosteric modulator of the GABA_{A} receptor, and possesses anticonvulsant effects. The unnatural enantiomer of etiocholanolone is more potent as a positive allosteric modulator of GABA_{A} receptors and as an anticonvulsant than the natural form.

Etiocholanolone has been studied as a pyrogenic steroid in the so-called steroid fever (or etiocholanolone fever), a condition similar to familial mediterranean fever (FMF). Etiocholanolone (like pregnanolone) activates the pyrin inflammasome. It is not known whether these endogenous steroids play a role in triggering FMF flares but they may make a link between stress, menstrual cycle and disease flares.

Etiocholanolone is produced from 5β-dihydrotestosterone, with 3α,5β-androstanediol as an intermediate.

== See also ==
- Androsterone
- Epiandrosterone
- Epietiocholanolone
- Etiocholanolone glucuronide
