= Androstanedione =

Names
- IUPAC name (5S,8R,9S,10S,13S,14S)-10,13-dimethyl-2,4,5,6,7,8,9,11,12,14,15,16-dodecahydro-1H-cyclopenta[a]phenanthrene-3,17-dione
- Other names Dihydroandrostenedione; 5α-Androstanedione; 5α-Androstane-3,17-dione

Identifiers
CAS Number	846-46-8
3D model (JSmol)	Interactive image
ChEBI	CHEBI:15994
ChEMBL	ChEMBL1230438
ChemSpider	193520
DrugBank	DB01561
PubChem CID	222865
UNII	2KR72RNR8Z
CompTox Dashboard (EPA)	DTXSID60880244
- InChI: InChI=1S/C19H28O2/c1-18-9-7-13(20)11-12(18)3-4-14-15-5-6-17(21)19(15,2)10-8-16(14)18/h12,14-16H,3-11H2,1-2H3/t12-,14-,15-,16-,18-,19-/m0/s1 Key: RAJWOBJTTGJROA-WZNAKSSCSA-N
- SMILES: C[C@]12CCC(=O)C[C@@H]1CC[C@@H]3[C@@H]2CC[C@]4([C@H]3CCC4=O)C

Properties
Chemical formula	C_{19}H_{28}O_{2}
Molar mass	288.431 g/mol
- Except where otherwise noted, data are given for materials in their standard state (at 25 °C [77 °F], 100 kPa). Infobox references

Androstanedione, also known as 5α-androstanedione or as 5α-androstane-3,17-dione, is a naturally occurring androstane (5α-androstane) steroid and an endogenous metabolite of androgens like testosterone, dihydrotestosterone (DHT), dehydroepiandrosterone (DHEA), and androstenedione. It is the C5 epimer of etiocholanedione (5β-androstanedione). Androstanedione is formed from androstenedione by 5α-reductase and from DHT by 17β-hydroxysteroid dehydrogenase. It has some androgenic activity.

In female genital skin, the conversion of androstenedione into DHT through 5α-androstanedione appears to be more important than the direct conversion of testosterone into DHT.
