= 3α-Androstanediol =

Names
- IUPAC name 5α-Androstane-3α,17β-diol
- Systematic IUPAC name (1S,3aS,3bR,5aS,7R,9aS,9bS,11aS)-9a,11a-Dimethylhexadecahydro-1H-cyclopenta[a]phenanthrene-1,7-diol
- Other names Hombreol

Identifiers
CAS Number	1852-53-5
3D model (JSmol)	Interactive image
ChEBI	CHEBI:36713
ChemSpider	15039
ECHA InfoCard	100.015.862
PubChem CID	15818
UNII	J34MX0M30Y
CompTox Dashboard (EPA)	DTXSID3022378
- InChI: InChI=1S/C19H32O2/c1-18-9-7-13(20)11-12(18)3-4-14-15-5-6-17(21)19(15,2)10-8-16(14)18/h12-17,20-21H,3-11H2,1-2H3/t12-,13+,14-,15-,16-,17-,18-,19-/m0/s1 Key: CBMYJHIOYJEBSB-KHOSGYARSA-N; InChI=1/C19H32O2/c1-18-9-7-13(20)11-12(18)3-4-14-15-5-6-17(21)19(15,2)10-8-16(14)18/h12-17,20-21H,3-11H2,1-2H3/t12-,13+,14-,15-,16-,17-,18-,19-/m0/s1 Key: CBMYJHIOYJEBSB-KHOSGYARBM
- SMILES: C[C@]12CC[C@H]3[C@@H](CC[C@H]4C[C@H](O)CC[C@@]43C)[C@@H]1CC[C@@H]2O

Properties
Chemical formula	C_{19}H_{32}O_{2}
Molar mass	292.463 g·mol^{−1}
- Except where otherwise noted, data are given for materials in their standard state (at 25 °C [77 °F], 100 kPa). Infobox references

3α-Androstanediol also known as 5α-androstane-3α,17β-diol and sometimes shortened in the literature to 3α-diol, is an endogenous steroid hormone and neurosteroid and a metabolite of androgens like dihydrotestosterone (DHT).

== Biological activity ==
3α-Androstanediol is an inhibitory androstane neurosteroid and weak androgen and estrogen.

As a neurosteroid, it acts as a potent positive allosteric modulator of the GABA_{A} receptor, and has been found to have rewarding, anxiolytic, pro-sexual, and anticonvulsant effects. As androgens such as testosterone and DHT are known to have many of the same effects as 3α-diol and are converted into it in vivo, it is thought that this compound may in part be responsible for said effects.

Relative to its isomer 3β-androstanediol, which is a potent estrogen, 3α-androstanediol has substantially lower, though still significant affinity for the estrogen receptors, with a several-fold preference for ERβ over ERα. It has approximately 0.07% and 0.3% of the affinity of estradiol at the ERα and ERβ, respectively.

== Biochemistry ==
Testosterone metabolism in humans
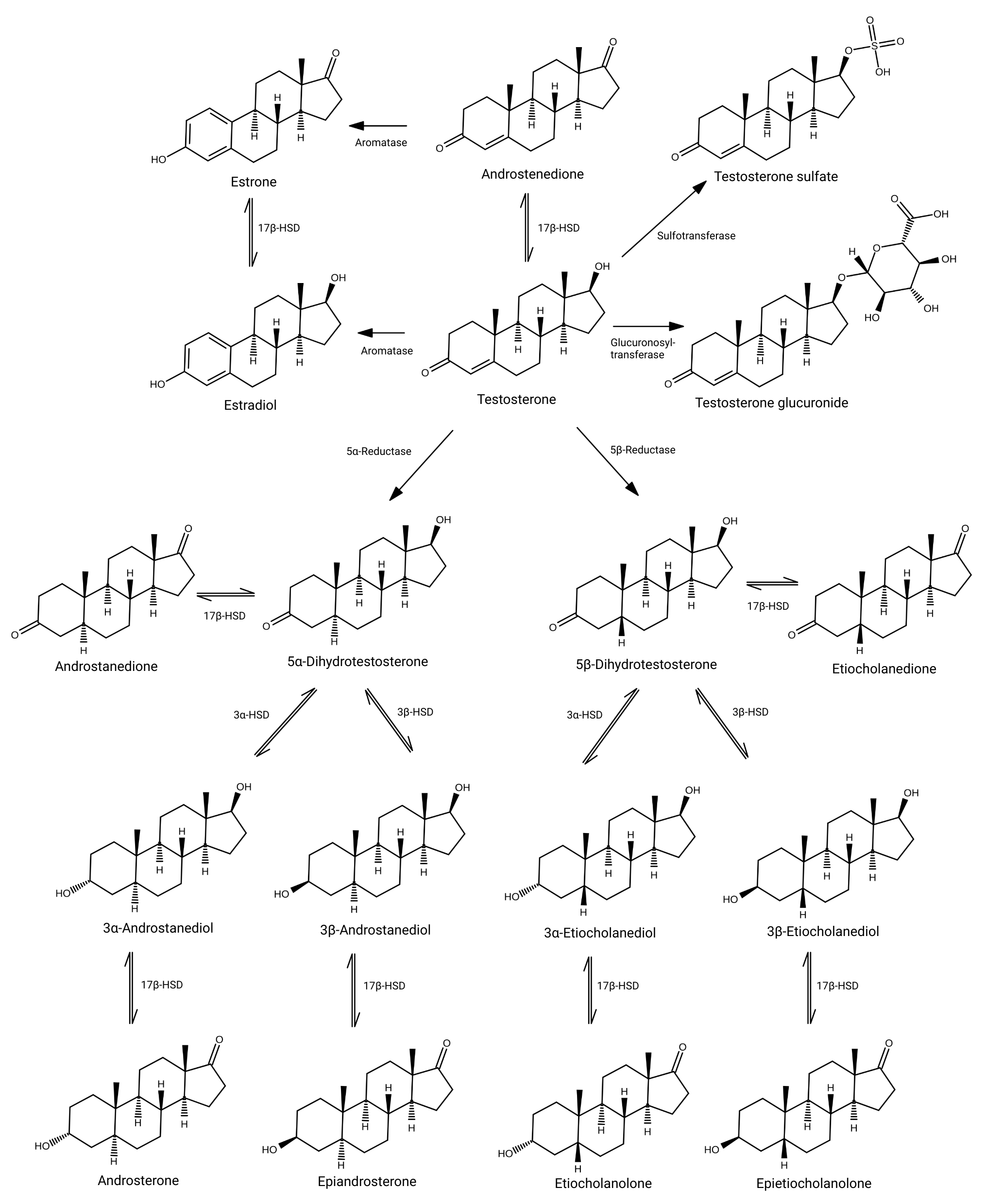
This diagram illustrates the metabolic pathways involved in the metabolism of DHT in humans. In addition to the transformations shown in the diagram, conjugation (e.g., sulfation and glucuronidation) occurs with DHT and metabolites that have one or more available hydroxyl (–OH) groups.

3α-Androstanediol shows high affinity for sex hormone-binding globulin (SHBG), similar to that of testosterone.

== Chemistry ==
3α-Androstanediol, also known as 5α-androstane-3α,17β-diol, is a naturally occurring androstane steroid and a structural analogue of DHT (5α-androstan-17β-ol-3-one). A notable positional isomer of 3α-androstanediol is 3β-androstanediol.

An orally active synthetic analogue of 3α-androstanediol, 17α-ethynyl-3α-androstanediol (HE-3235, Apoptone), was formerly under investigation for the treatment of prostate cancer and breast cancer.
