= Epiandrosterone =

Chemical compound

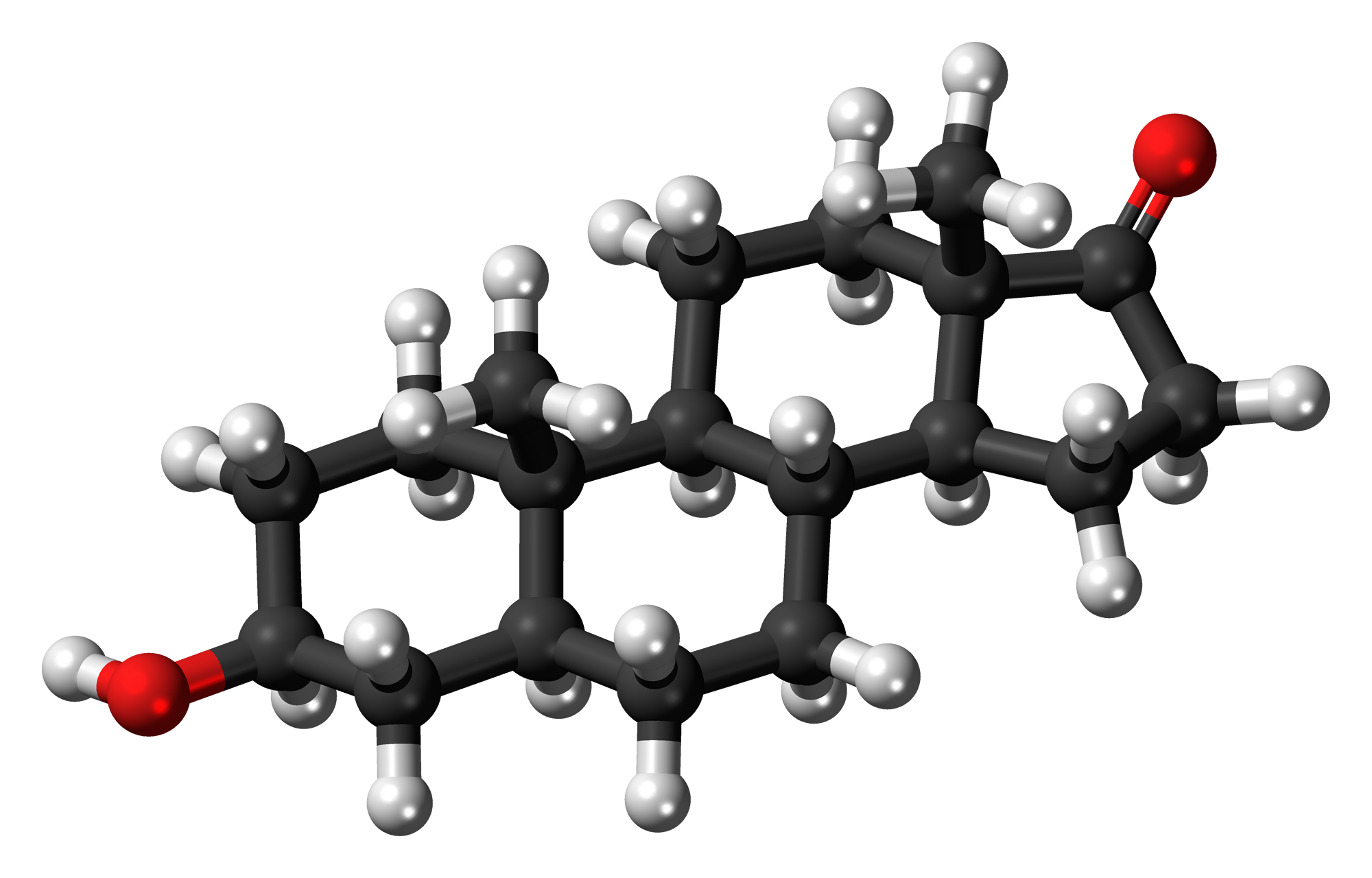

Clinical data
- ATC code: none

Identifiers
- IUPAC name: (3R,5S,8R,9S,10S,13S,14S)-3-hydroxy-10,13-dimethyl-1,2,3,4,5,6,7,8,9,11,12,14,15,16-tetradecahydrocyclopenta[a]phenanthren-17-one
- CAS Number: 481-29-8
- PubChem CID: 441302
- ChemSpider: 390065
- UNII: 8TR252Z538
- ChEBI: CHEBI:541975
- ChEMBL: ChEMBL272195
- CompTox Dashboard (EPA): DTXSID20289698
- ECHA InfoCard: 100.006.877

Chemical and physical data
- Formula: C_{19}H_{30}O_{2}
- Molar mass: 290.447 g·mol^{−1}
- 3D model (JSmol): Interactive image
- SMILES: O=C2[C@]1(CC[C@H]3[C@H]([C@@H]1CC2)CC[C@H]4C[C@@H](O)CC[C@]34C)C
- InChI: InChI=1S/C19H30O2/c1-18-9-7-13(20)11-12(18)3-4-14-15-5-6-17(21)19(15,2)10-8-16(14)18/h12-16,20H,3-11H2,1-2H3/t12-,13-,14-,15-,16-,18-,19-/m0/s1; Key:QGXBDMJGAMFCBF-LUJOEAJASA-N

Epiandrosterone, or isoandrosterone, also known as 3β-androsterone, 3β-hydroxy-5α-androstan-17-one, or 5α-androstan-3β-ol-17-one, is a steroid hormone with weak androgenic activity. It is a metabolite of testosterone and dihydrotestosterone (DHT). It was first isolated in 1931, by Adolf Friedrich Johann Butenandt and Kurt Tscherning. They distilled over 17,000 litres of male urine, from which they got 50 milligrams of crystalline androsterone (most likely mixed isomers), which was sufficient to find that the chemical formula was very similar to estrone.

Epiandrosterone has been shown to naturally occur in most mammals including pigs.

Epiandrosterone is naturally produced by the enzyme 5α-reductase from the adrenal hormone DHEA. Epiandrosterone can also be produced from the natural steroids androstanediol via 17β-hydroxysteroid dehydrogenase or from androstanedione via 3β-hydroxysteroid dehydrogenase.

== Applications ==
Epiandrosterone is used as a precursor to Desoxymethyltestosterone, Mestanolone, Vecuronium bromide, Pancuronium bromide, Zanoterone, and Estrone.

== See also ==
- 3β-Androstanediol
- Androstenol
- Androstenone
- Estratetraenol
