= 3β-Androstanediol =

Names
- IUPAC name 5α-Androstane-3β,17β-diol
- Systematic IUPAC name (1S,3aS,3bR,5aS,7S,9aS,9bS,11aS)-9a,11a-Dimethylhexadecahydro-1H-cyclopenta[a]phenanthrene-1,7-diol
- Other names 3β-Androstanediol; 3β-Diol; Maxterone

Identifiers
CAS Number	571-20-0
3D model (JSmol)	Interactive image
ChEMBL	ChEMBL316048
ChemSpider	211834
ECHA InfoCard	100.008.487
PubChem CID	242332
UNII	6J0K4253QD
CompTox Dashboard (EPA)	DTXSID8022379
- InChI: InChI=1S/C19H32O2/c1-18-9-7-13(20)11-12(18)3-4-14-15-5-6-17(21)19(15,2)10-8-16(14)18/h12-17,20-21H,3-11H2,1-2H3/t12-,13-,14-,15-,16-,17-,18-,19-/m0/s1 Key: CBMYJHIOYJEBSB-YSZCXEEOSA-N; InChI=1/C19H32O2/c1-18-9-7-13(20)11-12(18)3-4-14-15-5-6-17(21)19(15,2)10-8-16(14)18/h12-17,20-21H,3-11H2,1-2H3/t12-,13-,14-,15-,16-,17-,18-,19-/m0/s1 Key: CBMYJHIOYJEBSB-YSZCXEEOBK
- SMILES: O[C@H]4CC[C@]3([C@@H](CC[C@H]2[C@@H]1CC[C@H](O)[C@@]1(C)CC[C@@H]23)C4)C

Properties
Chemical formula	C_{19}H_{32}O_{2}
Molar mass	292.463 g·mol^{−1}
Melting point	168–170 °C (334–338 °F; 441–443 K)
- Except where otherwise noted, data are given for materials in their standard state (at 25 °C [77 °F], 100 kPa). Infobox references

3β-Androstanediol, also known as 5α-androstane-3β,17β-diol, and sometimes shortened in the literature to 3β-diol, is an endogenous steroid hormone and a metabolite of androgens like dehydroepiandrosterone (DHEA) and dihydrotestosterone (DHT).

== Biological activity ==
3β-Androstanediol is a selective, high-affinity agonist of the ERβ, and hence, an estrogen. In contrast to ERβ, 3β-androstanediol does not bind to the androgen receptor (AR). 3β-Androstanediol has been reported to also bind to ERα with low nanomolar affinity, with several-fold lower affinity relative to ERβ. It has approximately 3% and 7% of the affinity of estradiol at the ERα and ERβ, respectively. Unlike 3α-androstanediol, 3β-androstanediol does not bind to the GABA_{A} receptor.

3β-Androstanediol may be the primary endogenous ligand of ERβ in the prostate gland, and as a result of activation of the ERβ, 3β-androstanediol has antiproliferative effects against prostate cancer cells. Through the ERβ, 3β-androstanediol positively regulates oxytocin neurons and signaling in the paraventricular nucleus of hypothalamus, and has been found to have antidepressant, anxiolytic, cognitive-enhancing, and stress-relieving effects via this action. Androgens, including testosterone and DHT, are known to downregulate the hypothalamic-pituitary-adrenal axis, and this has been found to be due in part or full to their conversion into 3β-androstanediol rather than to activation of the AR.

== Biochemistry ==
Testosterone metabolism in humans
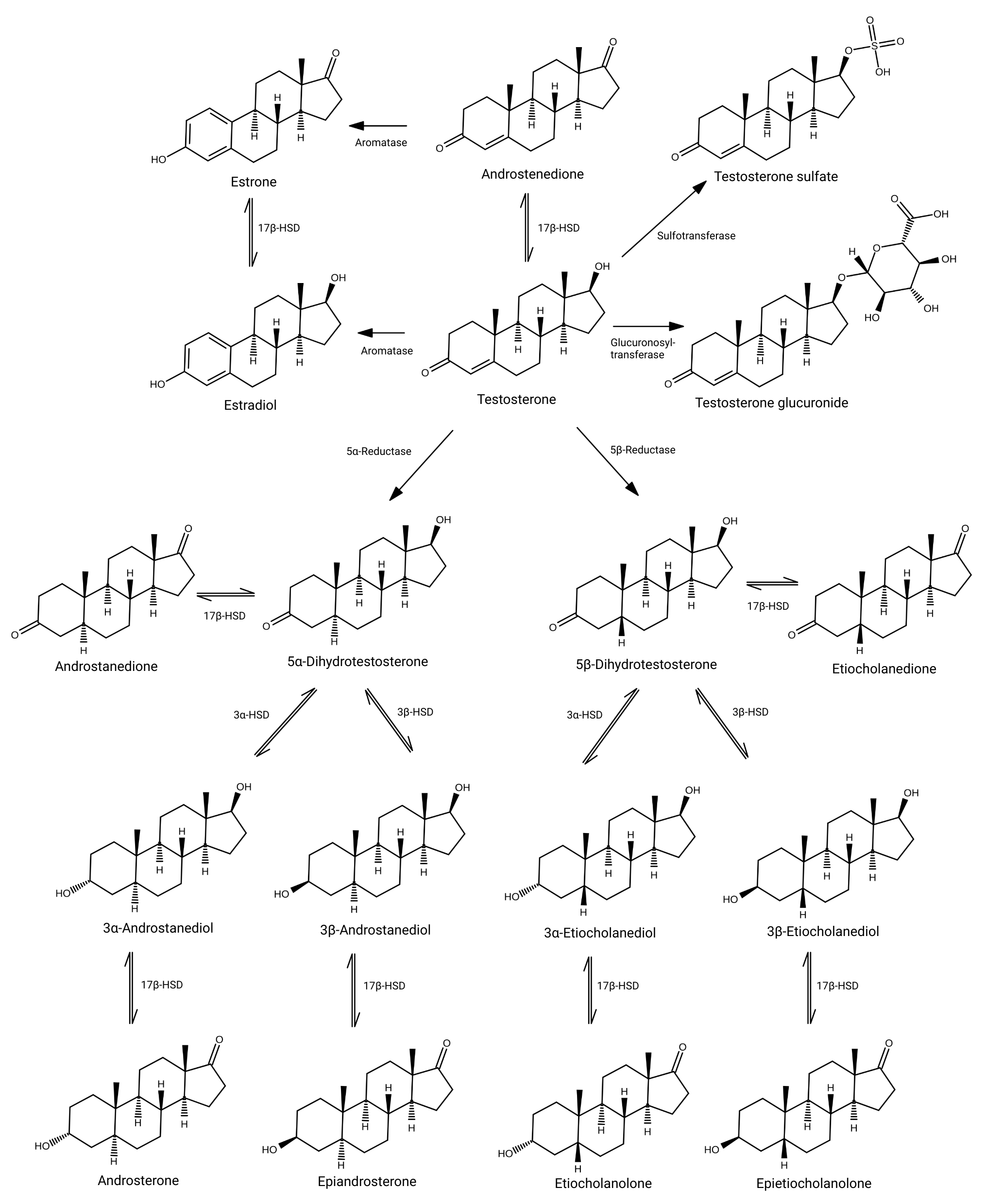
This diagram illustrates the metabolic pathways involved in the metabolism of DHT in humans. In addition to the transformations shown in the diagram, conjugation (e.g., sulfation and glucuronidation) occurs with DHT and metabolites that have one or more available hydroxyl (–OH) groups.

3β-Androstanediol is a 5α-reduced and 17β-hydroxylated metabolite of dehydroepiandrosterone (DHEA) as well as a 3β-hydroxylated metabolite of DHT (and by extension of testosterone).

A determination of the circulating levels of 3β-androstanediol in humans found concentrations of 239 ± 76 pg/ml and 82 ± 45 pg/ml of the compound in normal male and female serum, respectively.

3β-Androstanediol shows high affinity for sex hormone-binding globulin (SHBG), similar to that of DHT.

== Chemistry ==
3β-Androstanediol, also known as 5α-androstane-3β,17β-diol, is a naturally occurring androstane steroid and a structural analogue of DHT (5α-androstan-17β-ol-3-one). A notable epimer of 3β-androstanediol is 3α-androstanediol.

17α-Ethynyl-3β-androstanediol is a 17α-substituted derivative of 3β-androstanediol and is an estrogen similarly.
