= Androstane =

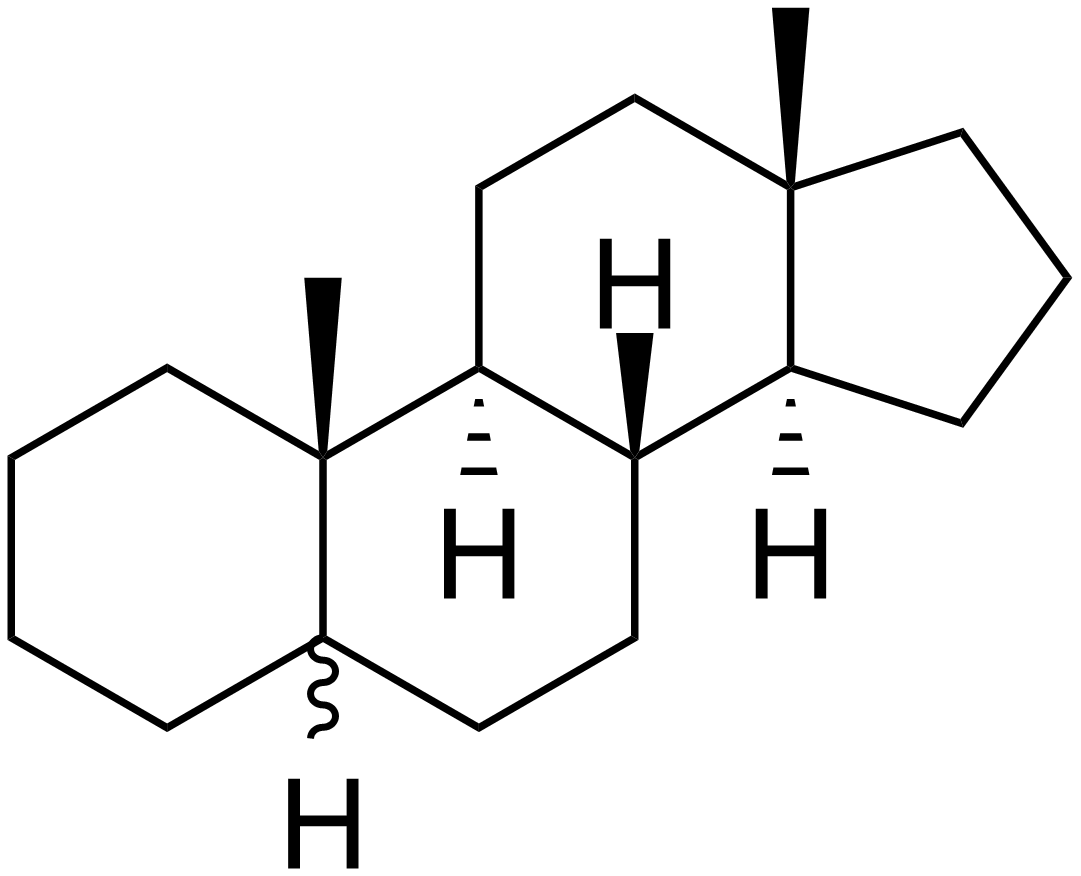

Names
- IUPAC name 5ξ-Androstane
- Systematic IUPAC name (3aS,3bS,5aΞ,9aS,9bS,11aS)-9a,11a-Dimethylhexadecahydro-1H-cyclopenta[a]phenanthrene
- Other names Etioallocholane; 10β,13β-Dimethylgonane

Identifiers
CAS Number	24887-75-0; 438-22-2 (5α); 438-23-3 (5β)
3D model (JSmol)	Interactive image; Interactive image
ChEBI	CHEBI:35509
ChemSpider	5256872
PubChem CID	94144
UNII	KT649U81FE (5α)
CompTox Dashboard (EPA)	DTXSID40179587
- InChI: InChI=1S/C19H32/c1-18-11-5-7-16(18)15-9-8-14-6-3-4-12-19(14,2)17(15)10-13-18/h14-17H,3-13H2,1-2H3/t14?,15-,16-,17-,18-,19-/m0/s1 Key: QZLYKIGBANMMBK-FZFXZXLVSA-N
- SMILES: C[C@@]12[C@](CCC2)([H])[C@]3([H])CCC4([H])CCCC[C@]4(C)[C@@]3([H])CC1; C3C1CCCC[C@@]1([C@H]2CC[C@]4([C@H]([C@@H]2C3)CCC4)C)C

Properties
Chemical formula	C_{19}H_{32}
Molar mass	260.465 g·mol^{−1}
Density	0.95 g/ml
- Except where otherwise noted, data are given for materials in their standard state (at 25 °C [77 °F], 100 kPa). verify (what is ?) Infobox references

Androstane is a C19 steroidal hydrocarbon with a gonane core. Androstane can exist as either of two isomers, known as 5α-androstane and 5β-androstane.

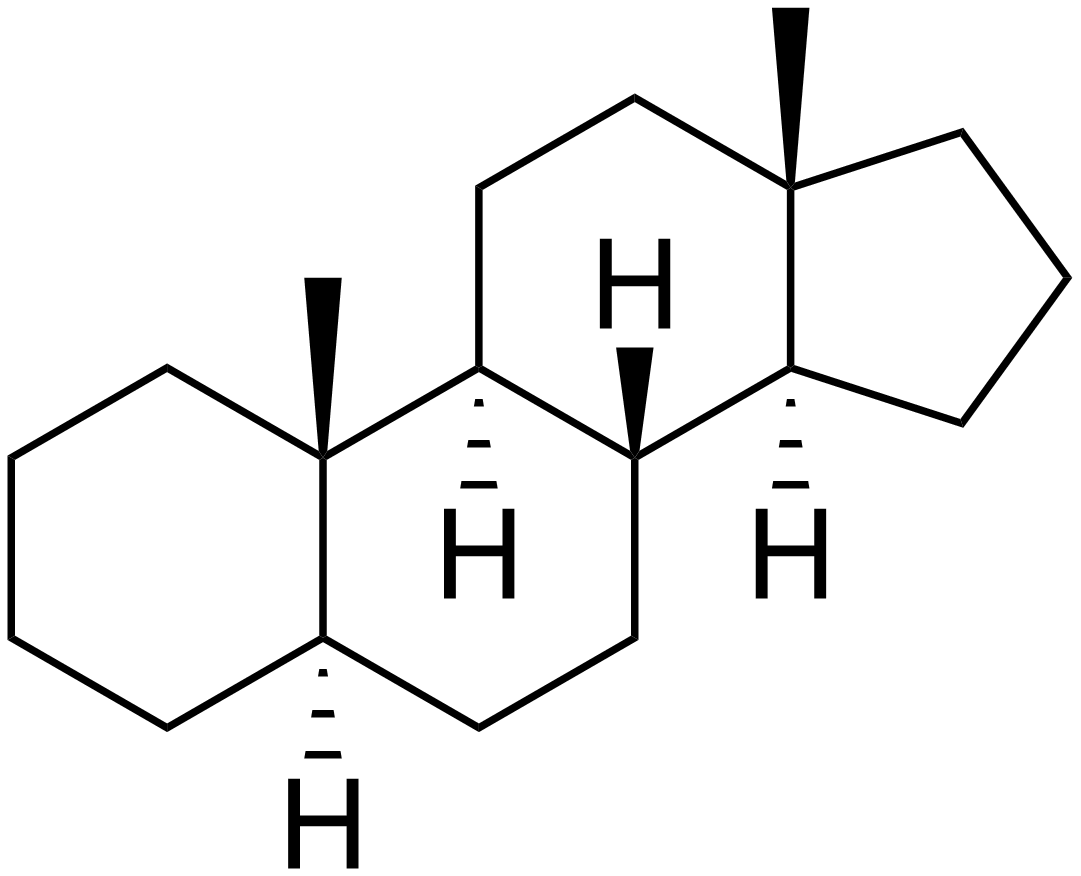
5α-Androstane

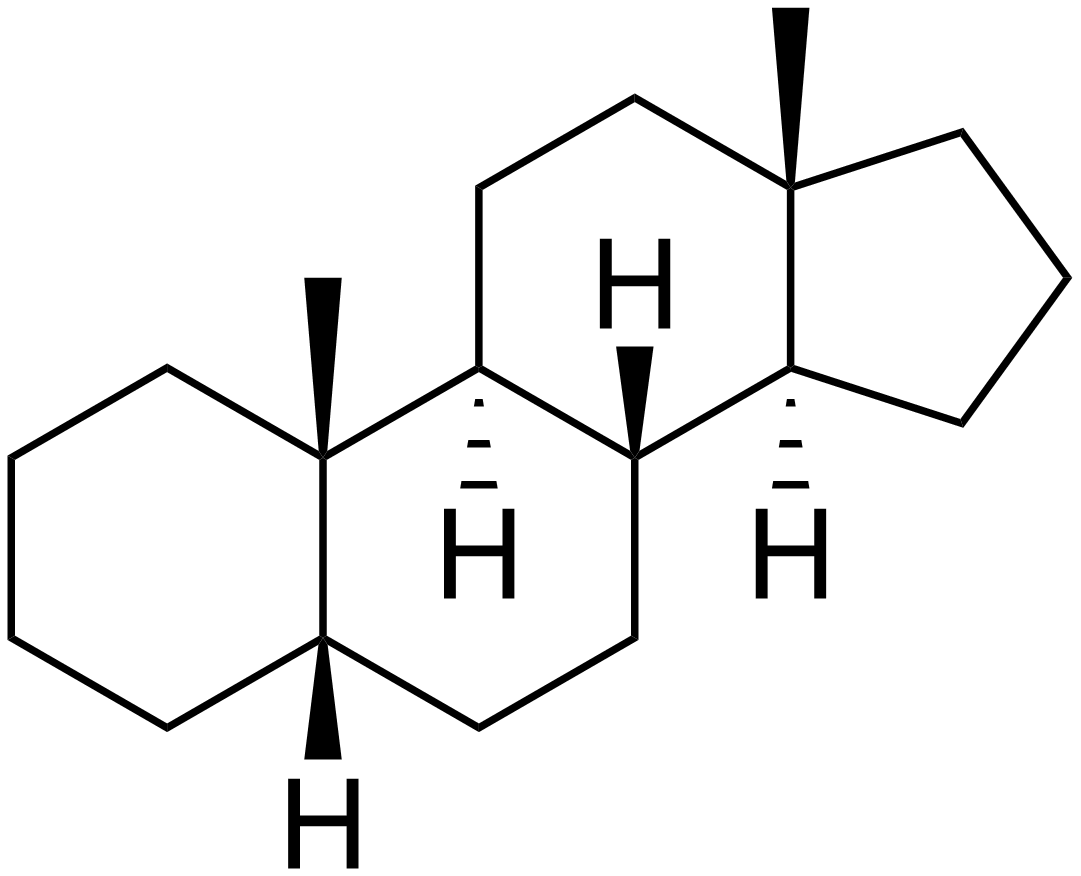
5β-Androstane

== Pharmacology ==
5α-Androstane is reported to be effective as an androgen, in spite of having no oxygen containing functional groups.

== Androstanes ==
Androstanes are steroid derivatives with carbons present at positions 1 through 19.

== See also ==
- Estrane and pregnane
- C_{19}H_{32}
