= Pharmacokinetics of testosterone =

Testosterone

Clinical data
- Routes of administration: Oral, buccal, sublingual, intranasal, transdermal (gel, cream, patch, solution), vaginal (cream, gel, suppository), rectal (suppository), intramuscular or subcutaneous injection (oil solution, aqueous suspension), subcutaneous implant (pellet)
- Drug class: Androgen, anabolic steroid

Pharmacokinetic data
- Bioavailability: Oral: very low (due to extensive first pass metabolism)
- Protein binding: 97.0–99.5% (to SHBG and albumin)
- Metabolism: Liver (mainly reduction and conjugation)
- Elimination half-life: 2–4 hours
- Excretion: Urine (90%), feces (6%)

The pharmacology of testosterone, an androgen and anabolic steroid (AAS) medication and naturally occurring steroid hormone, concerns its pharmacodynamics, pharmacokinetics, and various routes of administration.

Testosterone is a naturally occurring and bioidentical AAS, or an agonist of the androgen receptor, the biological target of androgens like endogenous testosterone and dihydrotestosterone (DHT).

Testosterone is used by both men and women and can be taken by a variety of different routes of administration.

== Routes of administration ==
Testosterone can be taken by a variety of different routes of administration. These include oral, buccal, sublingual, intranasal, transdermal (gels, creams, patches, solutions), vaginal (creams, gels, suppositories), rectal (suppositories), by intramuscular or subcutaneous injection (in oil solutions or aqueous suspensions), and as a subcutaneous implant. The pharmacokinetics of testosterone, including its bioavailability, metabolism, biological half-life, and other parameters, differ by route of administration. Likewise, the potency of testosterone, and its local effects in certain tissues, for instance the liver, differ by route of administration as well. In particular, the oral route is subject to a high first-pass effect, which results in high levels of testosterone in the liver and consequent hepatic androgenic effects, as well as low potency due to first-pass metabolism in the intestines and liver into metabolites like dihydrotestosterone and androgen conjugates. Conversely, this is not the case for non-oral routes, which bypass the first pass.

Different testosterone routes and dosages can achieve widely varying circulating testosterone levels. For purposes of comparison with normal physiological circumstances, circulating levels of total testosterone in men range from about 250 to 1,100 ng/dL (mean 630 ng/dL) and in women range from about 2 to 50 ng/dL (mean 32 ng/dL). Testosterone levels decline with age in men. In women with polyendocrine metabolic ovarian syndrome (PMOS), a condition of androgen excess, testosterone levels are typically around 50 to 80 ng/dL, with a range of about 30 to 140 ng/dL. Total testosterone levels are about 20-fold and free testosterone levels about 40-fold higher in men than in women on average. Similarly, testosterone production is approximately 30 times higher in men than in women.

Available forms of testosterone (Note: This table does not include combination products with other medications/hormones. The availability of specific products may vary by country - see Testosterone (medication) § Availability.)
| Route | Ingredient | Form | Dose (Note: These dosages may be given at varying frequencies - dosages listed are "each" (ex: per tablet, per spray, etc) and not indicative of total daily dose or equivalent.) | Brand names (Note: Other brand names may be currently or historically marketed.) |
|---|---|---|---|---|
| Oral | Test. undecanoate | Capsule | 40 mg | Andriol, Jatenzo, Kyzatrex, Tlando |
| Sublingual | Testosterone | Tablet | 10 mg | Testoral |
| Buccal | Testosterone | Tablet | 30 mg | Striant |
| Intranasal | Testosterone | Nasal gel | 5.5 mg/spray, 120 sprays | Natesto |
| Transdermal | Testosterone | Non-scrotal patch | 2.5, 4, 5, 6 mg/day | Androderm |
| Transdermal | Testosterone | Non-scrotal patch | 150, 300 μg/day | Intrinsa |
| Transdermal | Testosterone | Scrotal patch (Note: Potentially discontinued.) | 4, 6 mg/day | Testoderm |
| Transdermal | Testosterone | Topical gel | 25, 50, 75, 100, 125 mg/pump | AndroGel, Testim, Fortesta |
| Transdermal | Testosterone | Axillary solution | 30 mg/pump | Axiron |
| Rectal | Testosterone | Suppository | 40 mg | Rektandron |
| Injection (Note: May be by intramuscular injection or subcutaneous injection.) | Test. enanthate | Oil solution | 50, 100, 180, 200, 250 mg/mL | Delatestryl |
| Injection | Test. cypionate | Oil solution | 50, 100, 200, 250 mg/mL | Depo-Testosterone |
| Injection | Mixed test. esters (Note: Combination of testosterone propionate, testosterone phenylpropionate, testosterone isocaproate, and testosterone decanoate.) | Oil solution | 100, 250 mg/mL | Sustanon |
| Injection | Test. undecanoate | Oil solution | 750, 1000 mg | Aveed, Nebido |
| Implant | Testosterone | Pellet | 50, 75, 100, 200 mg | Testopel |
Footnotes and sources: Sources:

Androgen replacement therapy formulations and dosages used in men
| Route | Medication | Major brand names | Form | Dosage |
|---|---|---|---|---|
| Oral | Testosterone^{a} | – | Tablet | 400–800 mg/day (in divided doses) |
| Oral | Testosterone undecanoate | Andriol, Jatenzo, Kyzatrex | Capsule | 40–80 mg/2–4× day (with meals) |
| Oral | Methyltestosterone^{b} | Android, Metandren, Testred | Tablet | 10–50 mg/day |
| Oral | Fluoxymesterone^{b} | Halotestin, Ora-Testryl, Ultandren | Tablet | 5–20 mg/day |
| Oral | Metandienone^{b} | Dianabol | Tablet | 5–15 mg/day |
| Oral | Mesterolone^{b} | Proviron | Tablet | 25–150 mg/day |
| Sublingual | Testosterone^{b} | Testoral | Tablet | 5–10 mg 1–4×/day |
| Sublingual | Methyltestosterone^{b} | Metandren, Oreton Methyl | Tablet | 10–30 mg/day |
| Buccal | Testosterone | Striant | Tablet | 30 mg 2×/day |
| Buccal | Methyltestosterone^{b} | Metandren, Oreton Methyl | Tablet | 5–25 mg/day |
| Transdermal | Testosterone | AndroGel, Testim, TestoGel | Gel | 25–125 mg/day |
| Transdermal | Testosterone | Androderm, AndroPatch, TestoPatch | Non-scrotal patch | 2.5–15 mg/day |
| Transdermal | Testosterone | Testoderm | Scrotal patch | 4–6 mg/day |
| Transdermal | Testosterone | Axiron | Axillary solution | 30–120 mg/day |
| Transdermal | Androstanolone (DHT) | Andractim | Gel | 100–250 mg/day |
| Rectal | Testosterone | Rektandron, Testosteron^{b} | Suppository | 40 mg 2–3×/day |
| Injection (IM or SC) | Testosterone | Andronaq, Sterotate, Virosterone | Aqueous suspension | 10–50 mg 2–3×/week |
| Injection (IM or SC) | Testosterone propionate^{b} | Testoviron | Oil solution | 10–50 mg 2–3×/week |
| Injection (IM or SC) | Testosterone enanthate | Delatestryl | Oil solution | 50–250 mg 1x/1–4 weeks |
| Injection (IM or SC) | Testosterone enanthate | Xyosted | Auto-injector | 50–100 mg 1×/week |
| Injection (IM or SC) | Testosterone cypionate | Depo-Testosterone | Oil solution | 50–250 mg 1x/1–4 weeks |
| Injection (IM or SC) | Testosterone isobutyrate | Agovirin Depot | Aqueous suspension | 50–100 mg 1x/1–2 weeks |
| Injection (IM or SC) | Testosterone phenylacetate^{b} | Perandren, Androject | Oil solution | 50–200 mg 1×/3–5 weeks |
| Injection (IM or SC) | Mixed testosterone esters | Sustanon 100, Sustanon 250 | Oil solution | 50–250 mg 1×/2–4 weeks |
| Injection (IM or SC) | Testosterone undecanoate | Aveed, Nebido | Oil solution | 750–1,000 mg 1×/10–14 weeks |
| Injection (IM or SC) | Testosterone buciclate^{a} | – | Aqueous suspension | 600–1,000 mg 1×/12–20 weeks |
| Implant | Testosterone | Testopel | Pellet | 150–1,200 mg/3–6 months |
Notes: Men produce about 3 to 11 mg of testosterone per day (mean 7 mg/day in young men). Footnotes: ^{a} = Never marketed. ^{b} = No longer used and/or no longer marketed. Sources: See template.

Androgen replacement therapy formulations and dosages used in women
| Route | Medication | Major brand names | Form | Dosage |
|---|---|---|---|---|
| Oral | Testosterone undecanoate | Andriol, Jatenzo | Capsule | 40–80 mg 1x/1–2 days |
| Oral | Methyltestosterone | Metandren, Estratest | Tablet | 0.5–10 mg/day |
| Oral | Fluoxymesterone | Halotestin | Tablet | 1–2.5 mg 1x/1–2 days |
| Oral | Normethandrone^{a} | Ginecoside | Tablet | 5 mg/day |
| Oral | Tibolone | Livial | Tablet | 1.25–2.5 mg/day |
| Oral | Prasterone (DHEA)^{b} | – | Tablet | 10–100 mg/day |
| Sublingual | Methyltestosterone | Metandren | Tablet | 0.25 mg/day |
| Transdermal | Testosterone | Intrinsa | Patch | 150–300 μg/day |
| Transdermal | Testosterone | AndroGel | Gel, cream | 1–10 mg/day |
| Vaginal | Prasterone (DHEA) | Intrarosa | Insert | 6.5 mg/day |
| Injection | Testosterone propionate^{a} | Testoviron | Oil solution | 25 mg 1x/1–2 weeks |
| Injection | Testosterone enanthate | Delatestryl, Primodian Depot | Oil solution | 25–100 mg 1x/4–6 weeks |
| Injection | Testosterone cypionate | Depo-Testosterone, Depo-Testadiol | Oil solution | 25–100 mg 1x/4–6 weeks |
| Injection | Testosterone isobutyrate^{a} | Femandren M, Folivirin | Aqueous suspension | 25–50 mg 1x/4–6 weeks |
| Injection | Mixed testosterone esters | Climacteron^{a} | Oil solution | 150 mg 1x/4–8 weeks |
| Injection | Mixed testosterone esters | Omnadren, Sustanon | Oil solution | 50–100 mg 1x/4–6 weeks |
| Injection | Nandrolone decanoate | Deca-Durabolin | Oil solution | 25–50 mg 1x/6–12 weeks |
| Injection | Prasterone enanthate^{a} | Gynodian Depot | Oil solution | 200 mg 1x/4–6 weeks |
| Implant | Testosterone | Testopel | Pellet | 50–100 mg 1x/3–6 months |
Notes: Premenopausal women produce about 230 ± 70 μg testosterone per day (6.4 ± 2.0 mg testosterone per 4 weeks), with a range of 130 to 330 μg per day (3.6–9.2 mg per 4 weeks). Footnotes: ^{a} = Mostly discontinued or unavailable. ^{b} = Over-the-counter. Sources: See template.

Testosterone levels in males and females
Total testosterone
| Stage | Age range | Male | | Female | |
| Stage | Age range | Values | SI units | Values | SI units |
|---|---|---|---|---|---|
| Infant | Premature (26–28 weeks) | 59–125 ng/dL | 2.047–4.337 nmol/L | 5–16 ng/dL | 0.173–0.555 nmol/L |
| Infant | Premature (31–35 weeks) | 37–198 ng/dL | 1.284–6.871 nmol/L | 5–22 ng/dL | 0.173–0.763 nmol/L |
| Infant | Newborn | 75–400 ng/dL | 2.602–13.877 nmol/L | 20–64 ng/dL | 0.694–2.220 nmol/L |
| Child | 1–6 years | ND | ND | ND | ND |
| Child | 7–9 years | 0–8 ng/dL | 0–0.277 nmol/L | 1–12 ng/dL | 0.035–0.416 nmol/L |
| Child | Just before puberty | 3–10 ng/dL* | 0.104–0.347 nmol/L* | <10 ng/dL* | <0.347 nmol/L* |
| Puberty | 10–11 years | 1–48 ng/dL | 0.035–1.666 nmol/L | 2–35 ng/dL | 0.069–1.214 nmol/L |
| Puberty | 12–13 years | 5–619 ng/dL | 0.173–21.480 nmol/L | 5–53 ng/dL | 0.173–1.839 nmol/L |
| Puberty | 14–15 years | 100–320 ng/dL | 3.47–11.10 nmol/L | 8–41 ng/dL | 0.278–1.423 nmol/L |
| Puberty | 16–17 years | 200–970 ng/dL* | 6.94–33.66 nmol/L* | 8–53 ng/dL | 0.278–1.839 nmol/L |
| Adult | ≥18 years | 350–1080 ng/dL* | 12.15–37.48 nmol/L* | – | – |
| Adult | 20–39 years | 400–1080 ng/dL | 13.88–37.48 nmol/L | – | – |
| Adult | 40–59 years | 350–890 ng/dL | 12.15–30.88 nmol/L | – | – |
| Adult | ≥60 years | 350–720 ng/dL | 12.15–24.98 nmol/L | – | – |
| Adult | Premenopausal | – | – | 10–54 ng/dL | 0.347–1.873 nmol/L |
| Adult | Postmenopausal | – | – | 7–40 ng/dL | 0.243–1.388 nmol/L |
Bioavailable testosterone
| Stage | Age range | Male | | Female | |
| Stage | Age range | Values | SI units | Values | SI units |
| Child | 1–6 years | 0.2–1.3 ng/dL | 0.007–0.045 nmol/L | 0.2–1.3 ng/dL | 0.007–0.045 nmol/L |
| Child | 7–9 years | 0.2–2.3 ng/dL | 0.007–0.079 nmol/L | 0.2–4.2 ng/dL | 0.007–0.146 nmol/L |
| Puberty | 10–11 years | 0.2–14.8 ng/dL | 0.007–0.513 nmol/L | 0.4–19.3 ng/dL | 0.014–0.670 nmol/L |
| Puberty | 12–13 years | 0.3–232.8 ng/dL | 0.010–8.082 nmol/L | 1.1–15.6 ng/dL | 0.038–0.541 nmol/L |
| Puberty | 14–15 years | 7.9–274.5 ng/dL | 0.274–9.525 nmol/L | 2.5–18.8 ng/dL | 0.087–0.652 nmol/L |
| Puberty | 16–17 years | 24.1–416.5 ng/dL | 0.836–14.452 nmol/L | 2.7–23.8 ng/dL | 0.094–0.826 nmol/L |
| Adult | ≥18 years | ND | ND | – | – |
| Adult | Premenopausal | – | – | 1.9–22.8 ng/dL | 0.066–0.791 nmol/L |
| Adult | Postmenopausal | – | – | 1.6–19.1 ng/dL | 0.055–0.662 nmol/L |
Free testosterone
| Stage | Age range | Male | | Female | |
| Stage | Age range | Values | SI units | Values | SI units |
| Child | 1–6 years | 0.1–0.6 pg/mL | 0.3–2.1 pmol/L | 0.1–0.6 pg/mL | 0.3–2.1 pmol/L |
| Child | 7–9 years | 0.1–0.8 pg/mL | 0.3–2.8 pmol/L | 0.1–1.6 pg/mL | 0.3–5.6 pmol/L |
| Puberty | 10–11 years | 0.1–5.2 pg/mL | 0.3–18.0 pmol/L | 0.1–2.9 pg/mL | 0.3–10.1 pmol/L |
| Puberty | 12–13 years | 0.4–79.6 pg/mL | 1.4–276.2 pmol/L | 0.6–5.6 pg/mL | 2.1–19.4 pmol/L |
| Puberty | 14–15 years | 2.7–112.3 pg/mL | 9.4–389.7 pmol/L | 1.0–6.2 pg/mL | 3.5–21.5 pmol/L |
| Puberty | 16–17 years | 31.5–159 pg/mL | 109.3–551.7 pmol/L | 1.0–8.3 pg/mL | 3.5–28.8 pmol/L |
| Adult | ≥18 years | 44–244 pg/mL | 153–847 pmol/L | – | – |
| Adult | Premenopausal | – | – | 0.8–9.2 pg/mL | 2.8–31.9 pmol/L |
| Adult | Postmenopausal | – | – | 0.6–6.7 pg/mL | 2.1–23.2 pmol/L |
Sources: See template.

=== Oral administration ===
==== Oral testosterone ====
Testosterone is well-absorbed but extensively metabolized with oral administration due to the first pass through the intestines and liver. It is rapidly and completely inactivated in men at doses of less than 200 mg. In large doses, such as 200 mg however, significant increases in circulating testosterone levels become apparent. In addition, while a 60 mg dose has no effect on testosterone levels in men, this dose does measurably increase testosterone levels in prepubertal boys and women. The oral bioavailability of testosterone in young women after a single 25 mg dose was found to be 3.6 ± 2.5%. High levels of testosterone are also achieved with a 60 mg dose of oral testosterone in men with liver cirrhosis. These findings are attributed to induction of liver enzymes by testosterone and consequent activation of its own metabolism. Substitution dosages of oral testosterone in men are in the range of 400 to 800 mg/day. Such doses exceed the amount of testosterone produced by the body, which is approximately 7 mg/day, by approximately 100-fold. The elimination half-life of oral testosterone is rapid at about 5 to 7 hours. As a result, it requires administration several times per day in divided doses. Due to its limitations, such as the high doses required and necessity of multiple daily doses, oral testosterone is not used clinically in its unmodified form.

Oral testosterone has been studied in combination with a 5α-reductase inhibitor to reduce its first-pass metabolism and improve its bioavailability.

==== Oral testosterone undecanoate ====
Instead of in its free unesterified form, testosterone is used by oral administration in the form of testosterone undecanoate. Due to the unique chemical properties afforded by its long fatty acid ester chain, this testosterone ester is partially absorbed from the gastrointestinal tract into the lymphatic system, thereby bypassing a portion of first-pass metabolism in the liver and producing measurable increases in testosterone levels at much lower doses than free testosterone. Of oral testosterone undecanoate that reaches circulation, 90 to 100% is transported lymphatically. However, its duration remains short, with an elimination half-life of 1.6 hours and a mean residence time of 3.7 hours. Oral testosterone undecanoate is provided as 40 mg oil-filled capsules and requires administration 2 to 4 times per day (i.e., 80 to 160 mg/day) for substitution in men. It must be taken with food containing at least a moderate or "normal" amount of fat in order to achieve adequate absorption. In addition, there is very high interindividual variability in levels of testosterone with oral testosterone undecanoate. The bioavailability of oral testosterone undecanoate taken with food is 3 to 7%. Inappropriately high levels of testosterone have been observed with 10 to 40 mg/day oral testosterone undecanoate in women. The oral bioavailability of testosterone undecanoate in young women after a single 40 mg dose was found to be 6.8 ± 3.3%.

A novel self-emulsifying formulation of oral testosterone undecanoate in 300-mg capsules for use once per day is under development.

==== First-pass effect and differences ====
Oral testosterone and oral testosterone undecanoate are not hepatotoxic, unlike orally administered 17α-alkylated anabolic steroids such as methyltestosterone and fluoxymesterone but similarly to parenteral routes and forms of bioidentical testosterone like injections.

=== Buccal administration ===
Testosterone can be used by buccal administration (e.g., brand name Striant).

=== Sublingual administration ===
Testosterone can be used by sublingual administration. A 10 mg sublingual tablet with the brand name Testoral was previously marketed for use one to four times per day in men.

=== Inhalational administration ===
Testosterone has been studied by inhalation.

=== Intranasal administration ===
Testosterone can be used by intranasal administration (e.g., brand name Natesto).

=== Transdermal administration ===
Testosterone is available for transdermal administration in the form of gels, creams, scrotal and non-scrotal patches, and axillary solutions.

Transdermal testosterone gel has a bioavailability of about 8 to 14% when administered to recommended skin sites including the abdomen, arms, shoulders, and thighs. Scrotal skin is the thinnest skin of the body and has enhanced absorption characteristics relative to other skin areas. Application of testosterone gels and creams to the scrotum has been studied and achieves much higher levels of testosterone than conventional skin sites. Scrotal application of testosterone requires approximately 5-fold lower doses relative to non-scrotal application.

The development of transdermal preparations of testosterone (and of progesterone) has been more difficult than the case of estradiol. This is because testosterone levels in men are about 100 to 1,000 times higher than estradiol levels in women (300 to 1,000 ng/dL vs. 50 to 150 pg/mL, respectively). Non-scrotal testosterone patches were assessed and were found to be ineffective in raising testosterone levels in men. As a result, scrotal testosterone patches were initially marketed. Subsequently, however, non-scrotal testosterone patches with special permeation enhancers that could successfully increase testosterone levels were developed and marketed. However, non-scrotal testosterone patches nonetheless require a large skin area for application (up to 60 cm^{2}) and must be replaced daily.

Supraphysiological levels of dihydrotestosterone (DHT) occur with scrotal application of testosterone, whereas this does not occur with non-scrotal transdermal application. This is due to the high expression of 5α-reductase in scrotal skin. Estradiol levels are similar with scrotal versus non-scrotal application of transdermal testosterone.

Low-dose transdermal testosterone patches in women have been found to result in testosterone levels of 64 ng/dL with 150 μg/day and 102 ng/dL with 300 μg/day. When testosterone is used transdermally in women or trans men, hair growth at the application sites can happen.

=== Vaginal administration ===
Testosterone can be used by vaginal administration of creams, suppositories, and vaginal rings available from compounding pharmacies.

=== Rectal administration ===
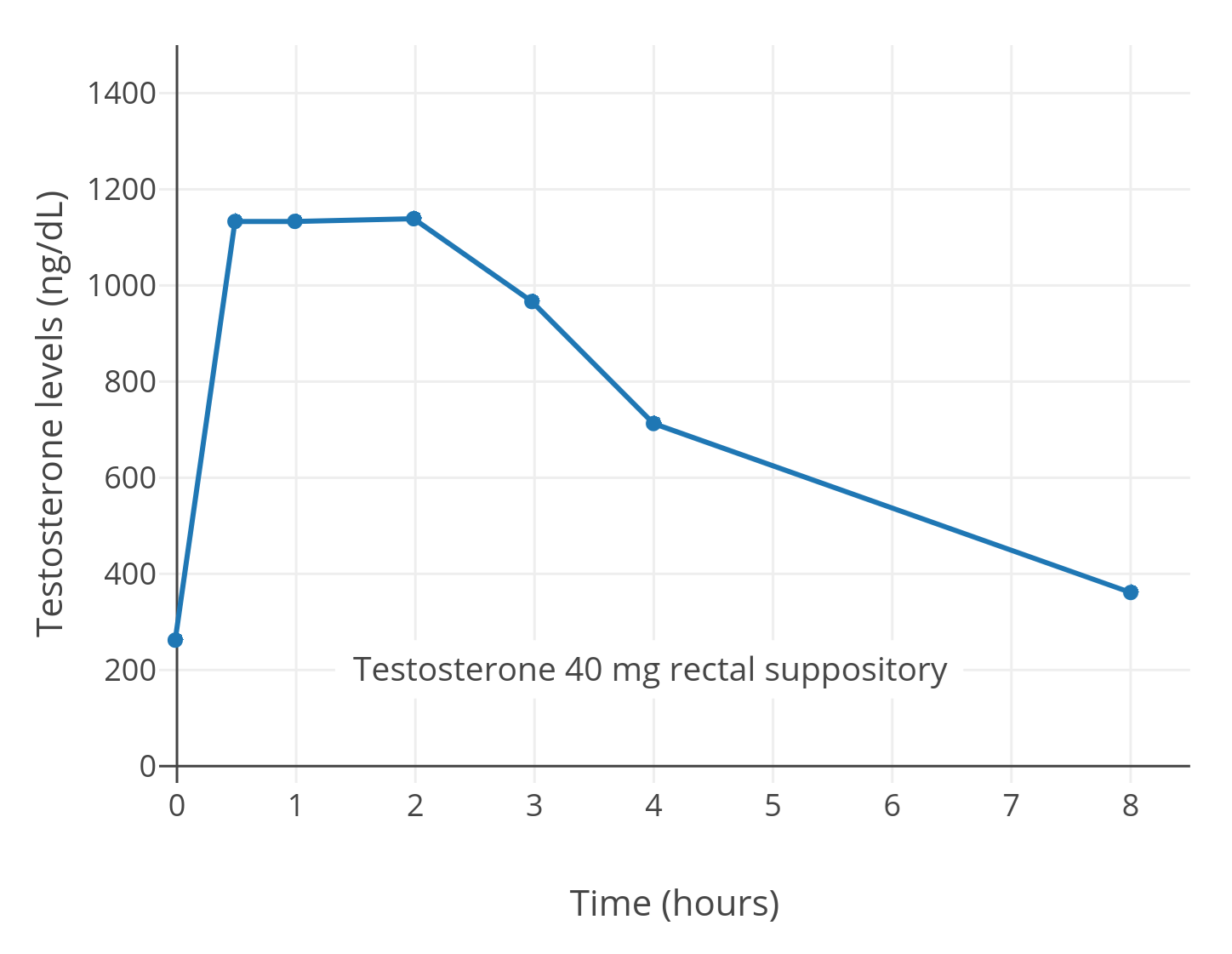
Testosterone levels with single-dose rectal administration of a 40 mg testosterone suppository in hypogonadal men.

Testosterone was marketed as a suppository for rectal administration by Ferring Pharmaceuticals from the early 1960s under brand names such as Rektandron and Testosteron. Rectal administration of testosterone avoids the first-pass effect with oral administration similarly to other non-oral routes. A single 40 mg dose of rectal testosterone has been found to result in maximal testosterone levels of almost 1,200 ng/dL within 30 minutes. Subsequently, testosterone levels steadily decline, reaching levels of about 700 ng/dL after 4 hours and levels of about 400 ng/dL after 8 hours. Other studies have also assessed the use of rectal testosterone, with similar findings. Rectal use of testosterone requires administration two or three times per day to maintain adequate testosterone levels. The route is poorly accepted, owing to its inconvenience. Rectal testosterone has been used in transmasculine hormone therapy.

=== Intramuscular injection ===
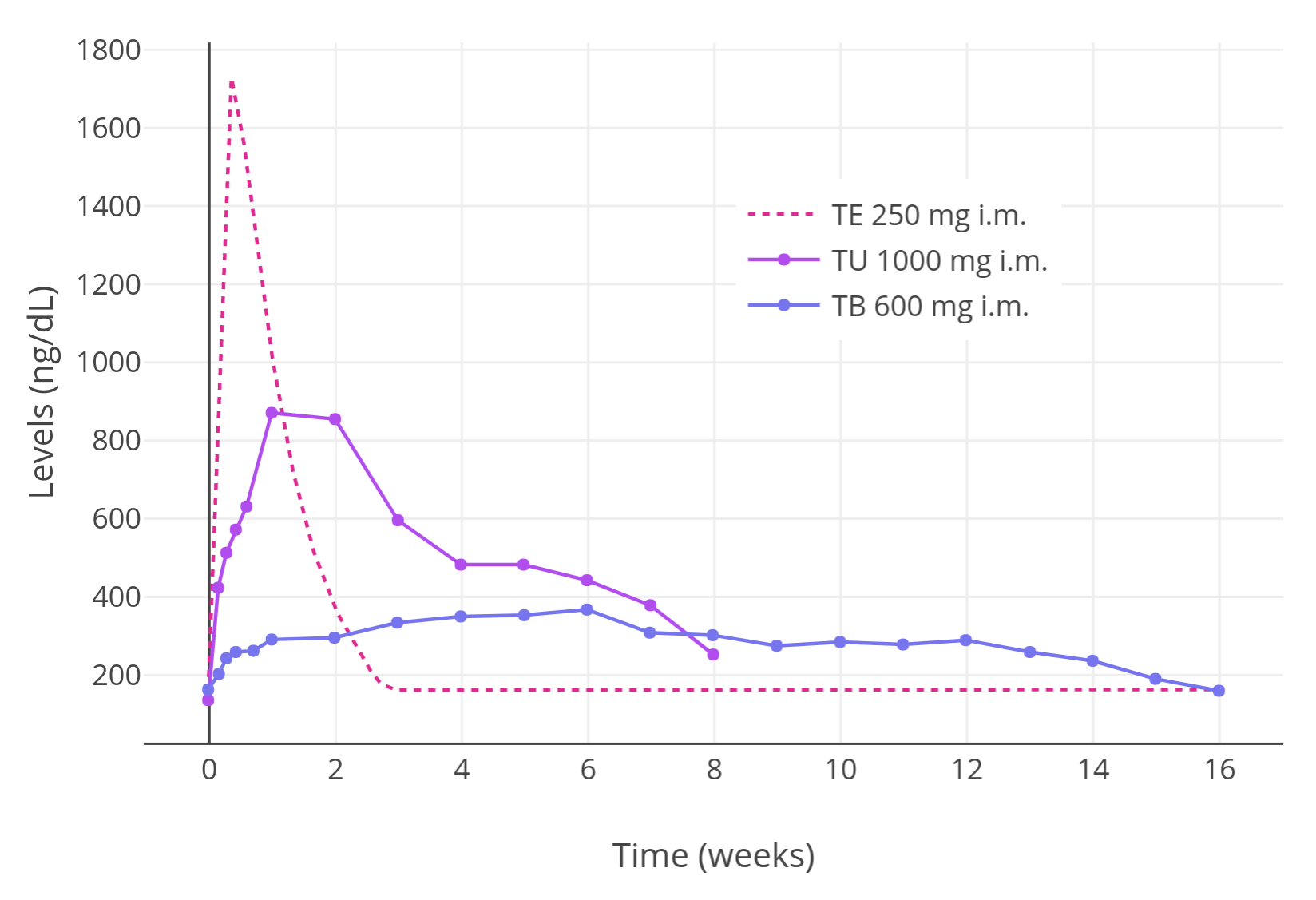
Testosterone levels over 16 weeks with intramuscular injection of different testosterone esters in hypogonadal men.

Testosterone can be administered by intramuscular injection either as an aqueous suspension of testosterone or as an oil solution or aqueous suspension of testosterone esters such as testosterone propionate, testosterone enanthate, testosterone cypionate, testosterone undecanoate, and testosterone isobutyrate. An even longer-acting testosterone ester that was developed but ultimately never marketed is testosterone buciclate. These preparations are prodrugs of progesterone that have a long-lasting depot effect when injected into muscle or fat, ranging from days to months in duration.

The bioavailability of drugs that are administered intramuscularly is generally almost 95%.

As oil solutions by intramuscular injection, the elimination half-lives of testosterone esters are 0.8 days for testosterone propionate, 4.5 days for testosterone enanthate, 20.9 days (in tea seed oil) and 33.9 days (in caster oil) for testosterone undecanoate, and 29.5 days for testosterone buciclate. The pharmacokinetics of testosterone cypionate are said to be the same as those of testosterone enanthate, with "extremely comparable" patterns of testosterone release. Due to their varying and different elimination half-lives, the different intramuscular testosterone esters are administered with differing frequencies. Testosterone propionate is injected two to three times per week, testosterone enanthate and testosterone cypionate are injected once every two to four weeks, and testosterone undecanoate and testosterone buciclate are injected once every 10 to 14 weeks. Due to its relatively short duration, testosterone propionate is now relatively little used and testosterone undecanoate is the preferred testosterone ester for intramuscular use. Testosterone undecanoate and testosterone buciclate can be injected intramuscularly as infrequently as four times per year.

High doses of testosterone esters by intramuscular injection have been studied in healthy young men. Levels of testosterone with intramuscular injections of testosterone cypionate were about 700 ng/dL for 100 mg/week, 1100 ng/dL for 250 mg/week, and 2000 ng/dL for 500 mg/week. In another study, testosterone levels with 600 mg/week testosterone enanthate by intramuscular injection were 2,800–3,200 ng/dL.

Intramuscular injection of testosterone propionate as an oil solution, aqueous suspension, and emulsion has been compared.

Intramuscular injection of testosterone-containing biodegradable microspheres has been studied.

Structural properties of major testosterone esters
| Androgen | Structure | Ester | | | | Relative mol. weight | Relative T content^{b} | logP^{c} |
| Androgen | Structure | Position(s) | Moiet(ies) | Type | Length^{a} | Relative mol. weight | Relative T content^{b} | logP^{c} |
|---|---|---|---|---|---|---|---|---|
| Testosterone | | – | – | – | – | 1.00 | 1.00 | 3.0–3.4 |
| Testosterone propionate | | C17β | Propanoic acid | Straight-chain fatty acid | 3 | 1.19 | 0.84 | 3.7–4.9 |
| Testosterone isobutyrate | | C17β | Isobutyric acid | Branched-chain fatty acid | – (~3) | 1.24 | 0.80 | 4.9–5.3 |
| Testosterone isocaproate | | C17β | Isohexanoic acid | Branched-chain fatty acid | – (~5) | 1.34 | 0.75 | 4.4–6.3 |
| Testosterone caproate | | C17β | Hexanoic acid | Straight-chain fatty acid | 6 | 1.35 | 0.75 | 5.8–6.5 |
| Testosterone phenylpropionate | | C17β | Phenylpropanoic acid | Aromatic fatty acid | – (~6) | 1.46 | 0.69 | 5.8–6.5 |
| Testosterone cypionate | | C17β | Cyclopentylpropanoic acid | Cyclic carboxylic acid | – (~6) | 1.43 | 0.70 | 5.1–7.0 |
| Testosterone enanthate | | C17β | Heptanoic acid | Straight-chain fatty acid | 7 | 1.39 | 0.72 | 3.6–7.0 |
| Testosterone decanoate | | C17β | Decanoic acid | Straight-chain fatty acid | 10 | 1.53 | 0.65 | 6.3–8.6 |
| Testosterone undecanoate | | C17β | Undecanoic acid | Straight-chain fatty acid | 11 | 1.58 | 0.63 | 6.7–9.2 |
| Testosterone buciclate^{d} | | C17β | Bucyclic acid^{e} | Cyclic carboxylic acid | – (~9) | 1.58 | 0.63 | 7.9–8.5 |
Footnotes: ^{a} = Length of ester in carbon atoms for straight-chain fatty acids or approximate length of ester in carbon atoms for aromatic or cyclic fatty acids. ^{b} = Relative testosterone content by weight (i.e., relative androgenic/anabolic potency). ^{c} = Experimental or predicted octanol/water partition coefficient (i.e., lipophilicity/hydrophobicity). Retrieved from PubChem, ChemSpider, and DrugBank. ^{d} = Never marketed. ^{e} = Bucyclic acid = trans-4-Butylcyclohexane-1-carboxylic acid. Sources: See individual articles.

Pharmacokinetics of testosterone esters
| Testosterone ester | Form | Route | T_{max} | t_{1/2} | MRT |
|---|---|---|---|---|---|
| Testosterone undecanoate | Oil-filled capsules | Oral | ? | 1.6 hours | 3.7 hours |
| Testosterone propionate | Oil solution | Intramuscular injection | ? | 0.8 days | 1.5 days |
| Testosterone enanthate | Castor oil solution | Intramuscular injection | 10 days | 4.5 days | 8.5 days |
| Testosterone undecanoate | Tea seed oil solution | Intramuscular injection | 13.0 days | 20.9 days | 34.9 days |
| Testosterone undecanoate | Castor oil solution | Intramuscular injection | 11.4 days | 33.9 days | 36.0 days |
| Testosterone buciclate^{a} | Aqueous suspension | Intramuscular injection | 25.8 days | 29.5 days | 60.0 days |
Notes: Testosterone cypionate has similar pharmacokinetics to Testosterone enanthate. Footnotes: ^{a} = Never marketed. Sources: See template.

Parenteral durations of androgens/anabolic steroids
| Medication | Form | Major brand names | Duration |
|---|---|---|---|
| Testosterone | Aqueous suspension | Andronaq, Sterotate, Virosterone | 2–3 days |
| Testosterone propionate | Oil solution | Androteston, Perandren, Testoviron | 3–4 days |
| Testosterone phenylpropionate | Oil solution | Testolent | 8 days |
| Testosterone isobutyrate | Aqueous suspension | Agovirin Depot, Perandren M | 14 days |
| Mixed testosterone esters^{a} | Oil solution | Triolandren | 10–20 days |
| Mixed testosterone esters^{b} | Oil solution | Testosid Depot | 14–20 days |
| Testosterone enanthate | Oil solution | Delatestryl | 14–28 days |
| Testosterone cypionate | Oil solution | Depovirin | 14–28 days |
| Mixed testosterone esters^{c} | Oil solution | Sustanon 250 | 28 days |
| Testosterone undecanoate | Oil solution | Aveed, Nebido | 100 days |
| Testosterone buciclate^{d} | Aqueous suspension | 20 Aet-1, CDB-1781^{e} | 90–120 days |
| Nandrolone phenylpropionate | Oil solution | Durabolin | 10 days |
| Nandrolone decanoate | Oil solution | Deca Durabolin | 21–28 days |
| Methandriol | Aqueous suspension | Notandron, Protandren | 8 days |
| Methandriol bisenanthoyl acetate | Oil solution | Notandron Depot | 16 days |
| Metenolone acetate | Oil solution | Primobolan | 3 days |
| Metenolone enanthate | Oil solution | Primobolan Depot | 14 days |
Note: All are via i.m. injection. Footnotes: ^{a} = TP, TV, and TUe. ^{b} = TP and TKL. ^{c} = TP, TPP, TiCa, and TD. ^{d} = Studied but never marketed. ^{e} = Developmental code names. Sources: See template.

=== Subcutaneous injection ===
Testosterone esters like testosterone enanthate and testosterone cypionate can be given by subcutaneous injection instead of intramuscular injection. Studies have shown that subcutaneous injection of testosterone and closely related esters in oil like testosterone cypionate, testosterone enantate, and nandrolone decanoate is effective and has similar pharmacokinetics to intramuscular injection.

=== Subcutaneous implant ===
Testosterone can be administered in the form of a subcutaneous pellet implant.

The bioavailability of testosterone when administered as a subcutaneous pellet implant is virtually 100%. Levels of testosterone vary considerably between individuals, but are fairly constant within individuals. The absorption half-life of subdermal testosterone implants is 2.5 months. The replacement interval is once every four to six months. A single 50 mg testosterone pellet implanted every 4 to 6 months has been found to result in testosterone levels of 70 to 90 ng/dL in women.

=== Intravenous injection ===
Testosterone esters like testosterone enanthate are hydrolyzed into testosterone so rapidly in the blood that testosterone and testosterone enanthate have nearly identical pharmacokinetics when administered via intravenous injection.

== General ==
=== Absorption ===
The oral bioavailability of testosterone is very low. The bioavailability of oral testosterone undecanoate is 3 to 7%. Topical testosterone gels have a bioavailability of about 8 to 14% when administered to recommended skin sites including the abdomen, arms, shoulders, and thighs. The bioavailability of testosterone by subcutaneous implant is virtually 100%. The bioavailability of drugs that are administered intramuscularly is generally almost 95%.

=== Distribution ===
In the circulations, 97.0 to 99.5% of testosterone is bound to plasma proteins, with 0.5 to 3.0% unbound. It is tightly bound to SHBG and weakly to albumin. Of circulating testosterone, 30 to 44% is bound to SHBG while 54 to 68% is bound to albumin. Testosterone that is unbound is referred to as free testosterone and testosterone that is bound to albumin is referred to as bioavailable testosterone. Unlike testosterone that is bound to SHBG, bioavailable testosterone is bound to plasma proteins weakly enough such that, similarly to free testosterone, it may be biologically active, at least to a certain extent. When referenced collectively (i.e., free, bioavailable, and SHBG-bound), circulating testosterone is referred to as total testosterone.

=== Metabolism ===
Testosterone metabolism in humans
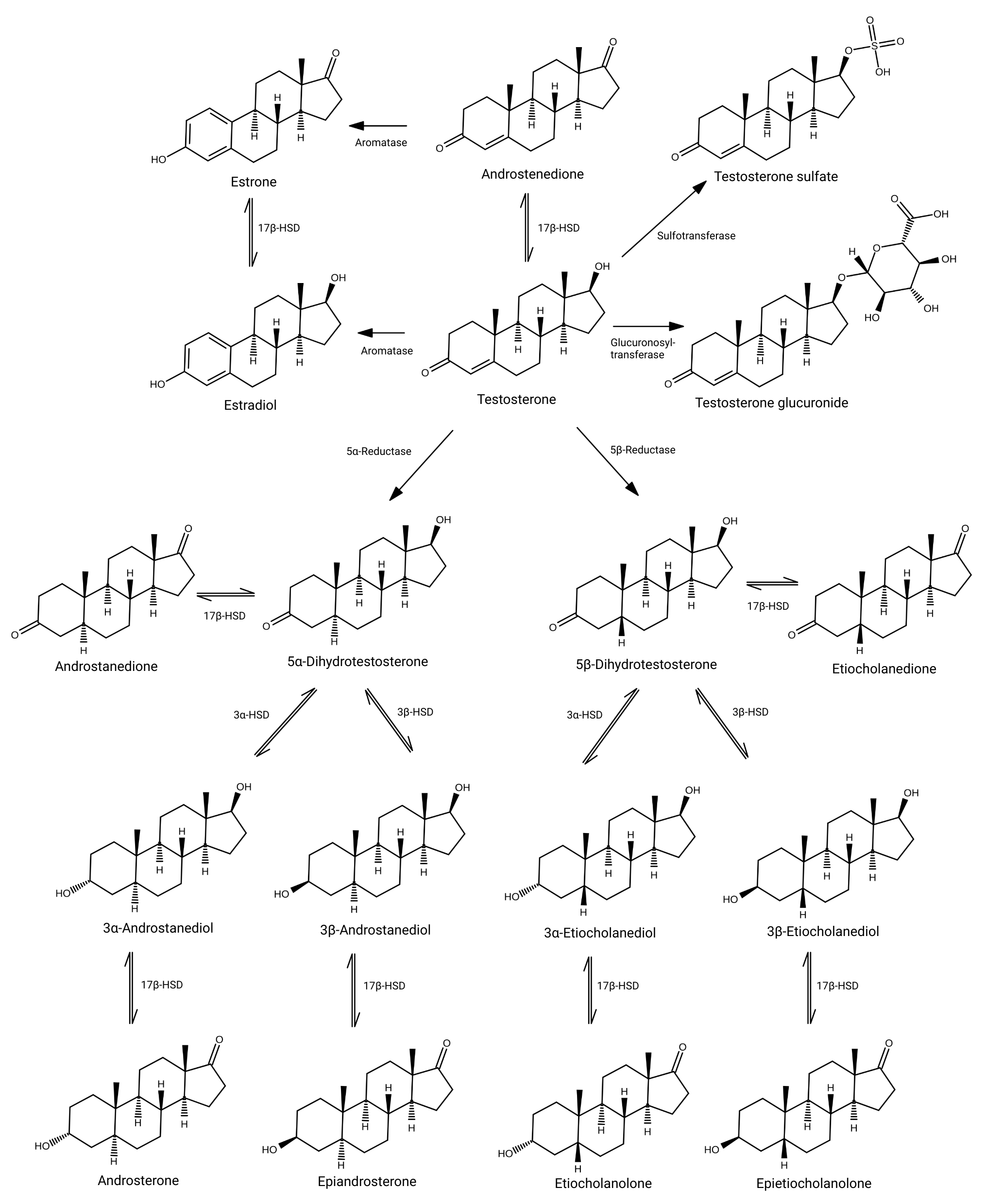
This diagram illustrates the metabolic pathways involved in the metabolism of testosterone in humans. In addition to the transformations shown in the diagram, conjugation via sulfation and glucuronidation occurs with testosterone and metabolites that have one or more available hydroxyl (–OH) groups.

Testosterone is metabolized primarily in the liver mainly (90%) by reduction via 5α- and 5β-reductase and conjugation via glucuronidation and sulfation. The major urinary metabolites of testosterone are androsterone glucuronide and etiocholanolone glucuronide.

The elimination half-life of testosterone varies depending on the route of administration and formulation and on whether or not it is esterified. The elimination half-life of testosterone in the blood or by intravenous injection is only about 10 minutes. Conversely, testosterone and testosterone esters in oil solution or crystalline aqueous suspension administered by intramuscular or subcutaneous injection have much longer half-lives, in the range of days to months, due to slow release from the injection site.

=== Elimination ===
Testosterone and its metabolites are eliminated in urine. It is excreted mainly as androsterone glucuronide and etiocholanolone glucuronide. It is also excreted to a small extent as other conjugates such as testosterone glucuronide (1%), testosterone sulfate (0.03%), and androstanediol glucuronides. Only a very small amount of testosterone (less than 0.01%) is found unchanged in the urine.

== See also ==
- Pharmacodynamics of estradiol
- Pharmacokinetics of estradiol
- Pharmacodynamics of progesterone
- Pharmacokinetics of progesterone
