= Androgen conjugate =

Class of chemical compounds

Testosterone metabolism in humans
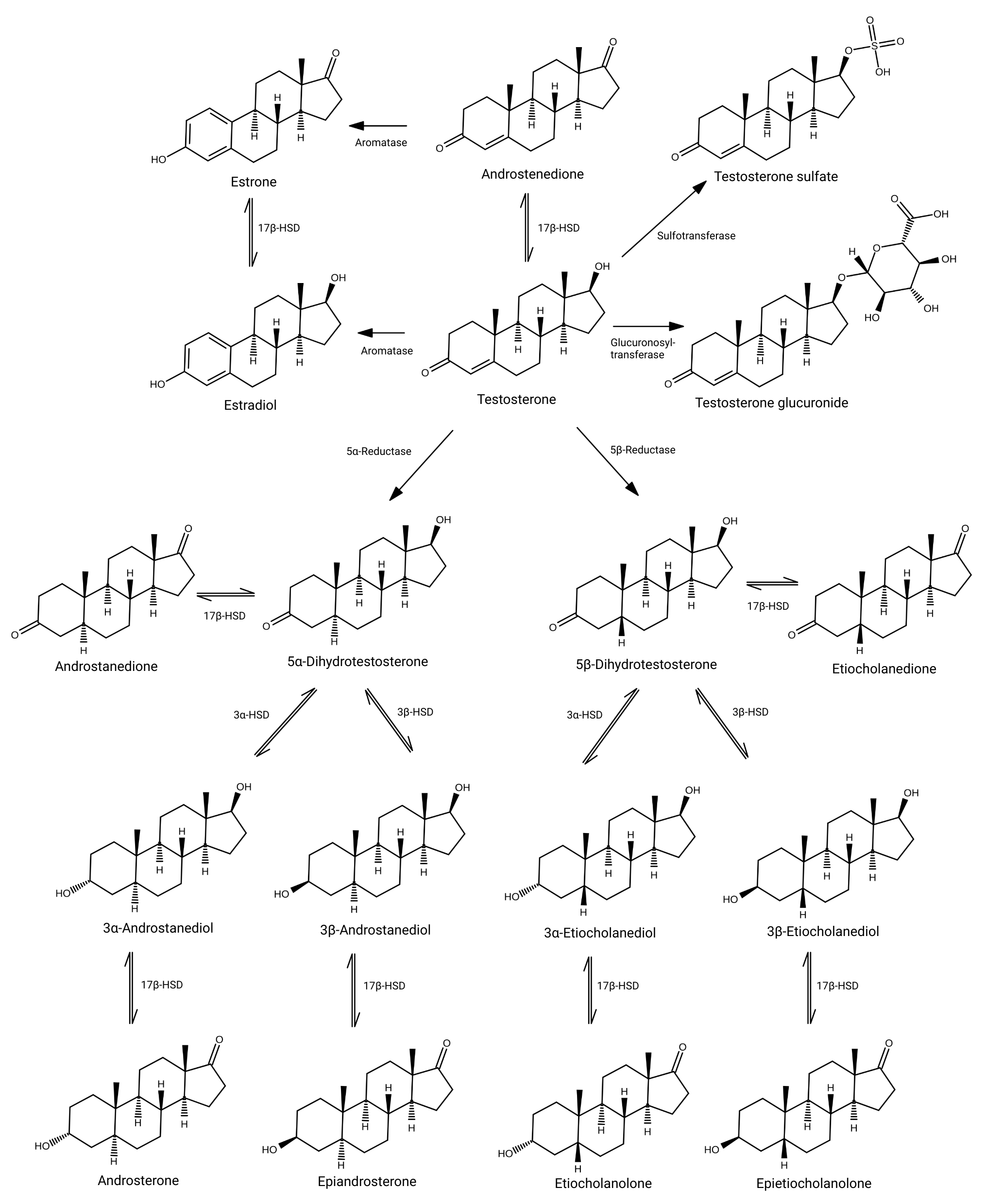
The metabolic pathways involved in the metabolism of testosterone in humans. In addition to the transformations shown in the diagram, conjugation via sulfation and glucuronidation occurs with testosterone and metabolites that have one or more available hydroxyl (–OH) groups.

An androgen conjugate is a conjugate of an androgen, such as testosterone. They occur naturally in the body as metabolites of androgens. Androgen conjugates include sulfate esters and glucuronide conjugates and are formed by sulfotransferase and glucuronosyltransferase enzymes, respectively. In contrast to androgens, conjugates of androgens do not bind to the androgen receptor and are hormonally inactive. However, androgen conjugates can be converted back into active androgens through enzymes like steroid sulfatase.

Examples of androgen conjugates include the sulfates testosterone sulfate, dehydroepiandrosterone sulfate, androstenediol sulfate, dihydrotestosterone sulfate, and androsterone sulfate, and the glucuronides testosterone glucuronide, dihydrotestosterone glucuronide, androsterone glucuronide, and androstanediol glucuronide.

Androgen conjugates are conjugated at the C3 and/or C17β positions, where hydroxyl groups are available.

== See also ==
- Androgen ester
- Estrogen conjugate
