= 17beta dehydrogenase =

17beta dehydrogenase or 17β dehydrogenase may refer to:

- Estradiol 17beta-dehydrogenase
- Testosterone 17beta-dehydrogenase
- 17β-Hydroxysteroid dehydrogenase (17β-HSD, HSD17B), also 17-ketosteroid reductases (17-KSR)
