= C25H38O8 =

The molecular formula C_{25}H_{38}O_{8} may refer to:

- Androsterone glucuronide, a major circulating and urinary metabolite of testosterone and dihydrotestosterone
- Etiocholanolone glucuronide, an endogenous, naturally occurring metabolite of testosterone
