= Testosterone (medication) =

Medication and naturally occurring steroid hormone

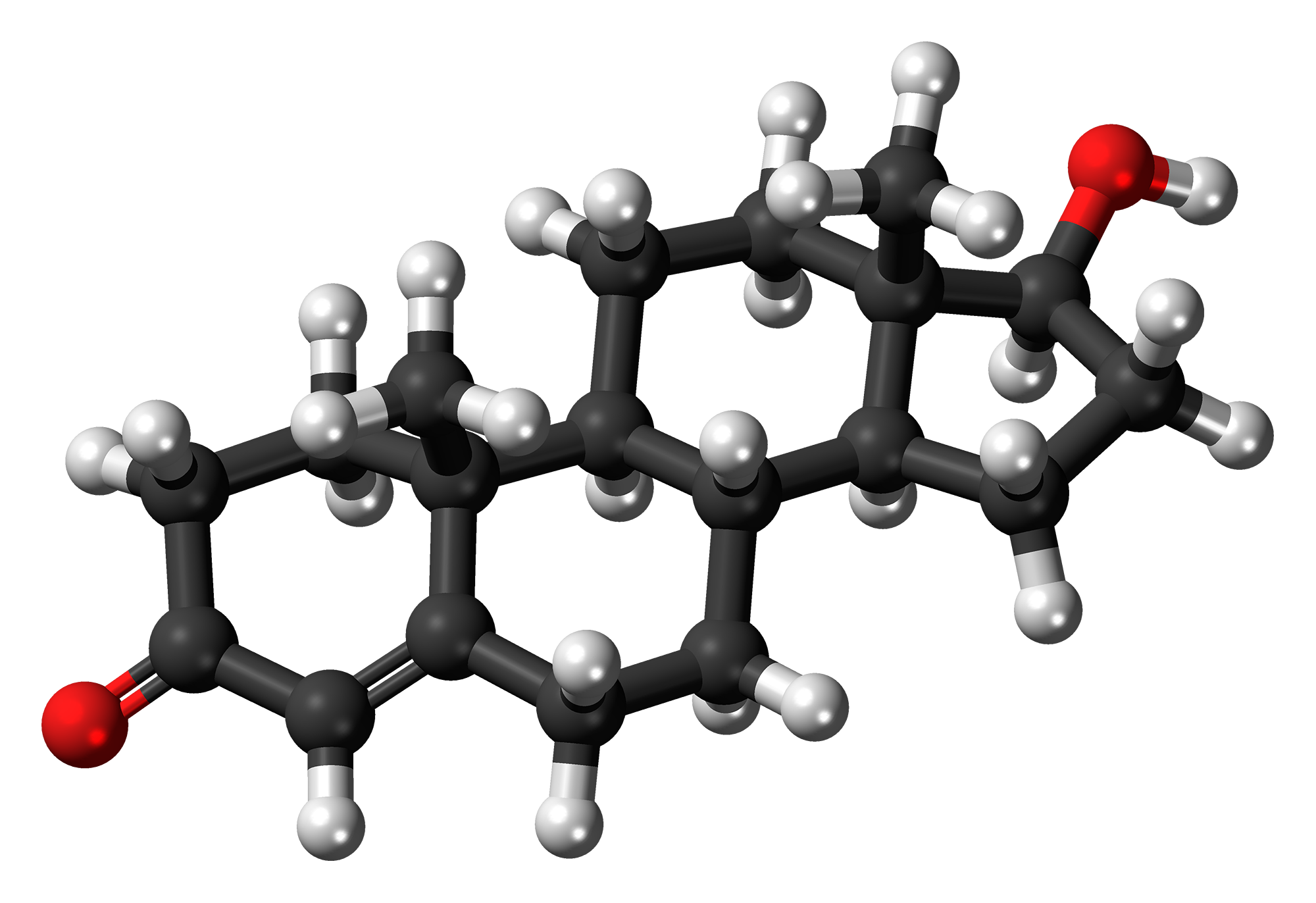

Clinical data
- Pronunciation: /tɛˈstɒstəroʊn/ teh-STOS-tə-rohn
- Trade names: AndroGel, Testim, TestoGel, others
- Other names: Androst-4-en-17β-ol-3-one
- AHFS/Drugs.com: Monograph
- MedlinePlus: a619028
- License data: US DailyMed: Testosterone
- Pregnancy category: AU: D; Contraindicated due to teratogenic effects
- Dependence liability: Moderate
- Addiction liability: Moderate
- Routes of administration: Buccal, intranasal, subcutaneous implant, transdermal (gel, cream, patch).
- Drug class: Androgen, anabolic steroid
- ATC code: G03BA03 (WHO)

Legal status
- Legal status: BR: Class C5 (Anabolic steroids); CA: Schedule IV; UK: Class C; US: Schedule III; EU: Rx-only; In general: ℞ (Prescription only)

Pharmacokinetic data
- Bioavailability: Oral: very low (due to extensive first pass metabolism)
- Protein binding: 97–99.5% (to SHBG and albumin)
- Metabolism: Liver (mainly reduction and conjugation)
- Elimination half-life: 2–4 hours
- Excretion: Urine (90%), feces (6%)

Identifiers
- IUPAC name: (8R,9S,10R,13S,14S,17S)-17-hydroxy-10,13-dimethyl-1,2,6,7,8,9,11,12,14,15,16,17-dodecahydrocyclopenta[a]phenanthren-3-one
- CAS Number: 58-22-0 57-85-2 (propionate) 315-37-7 (enanthate) 58-20-8 (cypionate) 5949-44-0 (undecanoate)
- PubChem CID: 6013
- IUPHAR/BPS: 2858
- DrugBank: DB00624
- ChemSpider: 5791
- UNII: 3XMK78S47O
- KEGG: D00075
- ChEBI: CHEBI:17347
- ChEMBL: ChEMBL386630

Chemical and physical data
- Formula: C_{19}H_{28}O_{2}
- Molar mass: 288.431 g·mol^{−1}
- 3D model (JSmol): Interactive image
- Specific rotation: +110.2°
- Melting point: 155 °C (311 °F)
- SMILES: O=C4\C=C2/[C@]([C@H]1CC[C@@]3([C@@H](O)CC[C@H]3[C@@H]1CC2)C)(C)CC4
- InChI: InChI=1S/C19H28O2/c1-18-9-7-13(20)11-12(18)3-4-14-15-5-6-17(21)19(15,2)10-8-16(14)18/h11,14-17,21H,3-10H2,1-2H3/t14-,15-,16-,17-,18-,19-/m0/s1; Key:MUMGGOZAMZWBJJ-DYKIIFRCSA-N

Testosterone is a medication and naturally occurring steroid hormone. It is used to treat male hypogonadism, gender dysphoria, and certain types of breast cancer. It may also be used with the intent to increase athletic ability in the form of doping. It is unclear if the use of testosterone for low levels due to aging is beneficial or harmful. Testosterone can be administered through several different routes, including topical gels or patches, nasal sprays, subdermal implants, or tablets dissolved inside the mouth. Testosterone therapy has been associated with improvements in depressive symptoms (especially in hypogonadal men), increased exercise capacity and muscle strength in men with chronic heart failure, and male contraception effectiveness.

Common side effects of testosterone include acne, swelling, and breast enlargement in men. Serious side effects may include liver toxicity, heart disease, and behavioral changes. Women and children who are exposed may develop masculinization. It is recommended that individuals with prostate cancer should not use the medication. It can cause harm to the baby if used during pregnancy or breastfeeding. Testosterone is in the androgen family of medications.

Testosterone was first isolated in 1935, and approved for medical use in 1939. Rates of use have increased three times in the United States between 2001 and 2011. It is on the World Health Organization's List of Essential Medicines. It is available as a generic medication. In 2023, it was the 119th most commonly prescribed medication in the United States, with more than 5 million prescriptions.

== Medical uses ==
The primary use of testosterone is the treatment of males with too little or no natural testosterone production, also termed male hypogonadism or hypoandrogenism (androgen deficiency). This treatment is referred to as hormone replacement therapy (HRT), or alternatively, and more specifically, as testosterone replacement therapy (TRT) or androgen replacement therapy (ART). It is used to maintain serum testosterone levels in the normal male range. Decline of testosterone production with age has led to interest in testosterone supplementation.

A 2020 guideline from the American College of Physicians supports the discussion of testosterone in adult men with age-related low levels of testosterone who have sexual dysfunction. They recommend yearly evaluation regarding possible improvement and, if none, to discontinue testosterone; physicians should consider intramuscular treatments, rather than transdermal treatments, due to costs and since the effectiveness and harm of either method is similar. Testosterone treatment for reasons other than possible improvement of sexual dysfunction may not be recommended.

=== Deficiency ===
Testosterone deficiency (also termed hypotestosteronism or hypotestosteronemia) is an abnormally low testosterone production. It may occur because of testicular dysfunction (primary hypogonadism) or hypothalamic–pituitary dysfunction (secondary hypogonadism) and may be congenital or acquired.

Androgen replacement therapy formulations and dosages used in men
Route	Medication	Major brand names	Form	Dosage
Oral	Testosterone^{a}	–	Tablet	400–800 mg/day (in divided doses)
Oral	Testosterone undecanoate	Andriol, Jatenzo, Kyzatrex	Capsule	40–80 mg/2–4× day (with meals)
Oral	Methyltestosterone^{b}	Android, Metandren, Testred	Tablet	10–50 mg/day
Oral	Fluoxymesterone^{b}	Halotestin, Ora-Testryl, Ultandren	Tablet	5–20 mg/day
Oral	Metandienone^{b}	Dianabol	Tablet	5–15 mg/day
Oral	Mesterolone^{b}	Proviron	Tablet	25–150 mg/day
Sublingual	Testosterone^{b}	Testoral	Tablet	5–10 mg 1–4×/day
Sublingual	Methyltestosterone^{b}	Metandren, Oreton Methyl	Tablet	10–30 mg/day
Buccal	Testosterone	Striant	Tablet	30 mg 2×/day
Buccal	Methyltestosterone^{b}	Metandren, Oreton Methyl	Tablet	5–25 mg/day
Transdermal	Testosterone	AndroGel, Testim, TestoGel	Gel	25–125 mg/day
Transdermal	Testosterone	Androderm, AndroPatch, TestoPatch	Non-scrotal patch	2.5–15 mg/day
Transdermal	Testosterone	Testoderm	Scrotal patch	4–6 mg/day
Transdermal	Testosterone	Axiron	Axillary solution	30–120 mg/day
Transdermal	Androstanolone (DHT)	Andractim	Gel	100–250 mg/day
Rectal	Testosterone	Rektandron, Testosteron^{b}	Suppository	40 mg 2–3×/day
Injection (IM or SC)	Testosterone	Andronaq, Sterotate, Virosterone	Aqueous suspension	10–50 mg 2–3×/week
Injection (IM or SC)	Testosterone propionate^{b}	Testoviron	Oil solution	10–50 mg 2–3×/week
Injection (IM or SC)	Testosterone enanthate	Delatestryl	Oil solution	50–250 mg 1x/1–4 weeks
Injection (IM or SC)	Testosterone enanthate	Xyosted	Auto-injector	50–100 mg 1×/week
Injection (IM or SC)	Testosterone cypionate	Depo-Testosterone	Oil solution	50–250 mg 1x/1–4 weeks
Injection (IM or SC)	Testosterone isobutyrate	Agovirin Depot	Aqueous suspension	50–100 mg 1x/1–2 weeks
Injection (IM or SC)	Testosterone phenylacetate^{b}	Perandren, Androject	Oil solution	50–200 mg 1×/3–5 weeks
Injection (IM or SC)	Mixed testosterone esters	Sustanon 100, Sustanon 250	Oil solution	50–250 mg 1×/2–4 weeks
Injection (IM or SC)	Testosterone undecanoate	Aveed, Nebido	Oil solution	750–1,000 mg 1×/10–14 weeks
Injection (IM or SC)	Testosterone buciclate^{a}	–	Aqueous suspension	600–1,000 mg 1×/12–20 weeks
Implant	Testosterone	Testopel	Pellet	150–1,200 mg/3–6 months
Notes: Men produce about 3 to 11 mg of testosterone per day (mean 7 mg/day in young men). Footnotes: ^{a} = Never marketed. ^{b} = No longer used and/or no longer marketed. Sources: See template.

=== Low levels due to aging ===
Testosterone levels may decline gradually with age. The United States Food and Drug Administration (FDA) stated in 2015 that neither the benefits nor the safety of testosterone supplement have been established for low testosterone levels due to aging. The FDA has required that labels on testosterone include warnings about increased risk of heart attacks and stroke.

=== Transgender men ===
To take advantage of its virilizing effects, testosterone, often shortened to T, is administered to transgender men and other transmasculine individuals as part of masculinizing hormone therapy, titrated to clinical effect with a "target level" of the average male's testosterone level.

Medications and dosages used in transgender men
Medication	Brand name	Type	Route	Dosage (Note: The natural production of testosterone by the male testes is between 3 and 11 mg per day.)
Testosterone undecanoate	Andriol, Jatenzo	Androgen	Oral	40–80 mg up to three times/day
Testosterone	Striant	Androgen	Buccal	30mg twice daily
Testosterone	Natesto	Androgen	Nasal spray	11mg three times daily
Testosterone	AndroGel (Note: Also available under other brand names.)	Androgen	TD gel	25–100mg/day
Testosterone	Androderm	Androgen	TD patch	2.5–10mg/day
Testosterone	Axiron	Androgen	TD liquid	30–120mg/day
Testosterone	Testopel	Androgen	SC	150–600mg every 3–6 months
Testosterone enanthate	Delatestryl	Androgen	IM, SC	50–100mg once/week or 100–250mg every 2–4 wks
Testosterone cypionate	Depo-Test	Androgen	IM, SC	50–100mg once/week or 100–250mg every 2–4 wks
Testosterone isobutyrate	Agovirin Depot	Androgen	IM, SC	50–100mg once/week
Mixed testosterone esters	Sustanon 250	Androgen	IM, SC	250mg every 2–3 wks or 500mg every 3–6 wks
Testosterone undecanoate	Aveed	Androgen	IM, SC	750–1,000mg every 10–14 wks
Nandrolone decanoate	Deca-Durabolin	Androgen	IM, SC	?
GnRH analogues	Various	GnRH modulator	Various	Variable
Elagolix	Orilissa	GnRH antagonist	Oral	150mg/day or 200mg twice/day
Medroxyprogesterone acetate (Note: For suppression of menses.)	Provera	Progestin	Oral	5–10mg/day
Medroxyprogesterone acetate	Depo-Provera	Progestin	IM	150mg every 3 months
Medroxyprogesterone acetate	Depo-SubQ Provera 104	Progestin	SC	104mg every 3 months
Lynestrenol	Orgametril	Progestin	Oral	5–10mg/day
Finasteride (Note: For prevention/treatment of scalp hair loss.)	Propecia	5αR inhibitor	Oral	1mg/day
Dutasteride	Avodart	5αR inhibitor	Oral	0.5mg/day

=== Women ===
Testosterone therapy is effective in the short-term for the treatment of hypoactive sexual desire disorder (HSDD) in women. However, its long-term safety is unclear. Because of a lack data to support its efficacy and safety, the Endocrine Society recommends against the routine use of testosterone in women to treat low androgen levels due to hypopituitarism, adrenal insufficiency, surgical removal of the ovaries, high-dose corticosteroid therapy, or other causes. Similarly, because of a lack of data to support its efficacy and safety, the Endocrine Society recommends against the use of testosterone in women to improve general well-being, to treat infertility, sexual dysfunction due to causes other than HSDD, or to improve cognitive, cardiovascular, metabolic, and/or bone health.

A 2014 systematic review and meta-analysis of 35 studies consisting of over 5,000 postmenopausal women with normal adrenal gland function found that testosterone therapy was associated with significant improvement in a variety of domains of sexual function. These domains included frequency of sexual activity, orgasm, arousal, and sexual satisfaction, among others. Women who were menopausal due to ovariectomy showed significantly greater improvement in sexual function with testosterone relative to those who had normal menopause. In addition to beneficial effects on sexual function, testosterone was associated with unfavorable changes in blood lipids. These included decreased levels of total cholesterol, triglycerides, and high-density lipoprotein (HDL) cholesterol, and increased levels of low-density lipoprotein (LDL) cholesterol. However, the changes were small in magnitude, and the long-term significance in relation to cardiovascular outcomes is uncertain. The changes were more pronounced with oral testosterone undecanoate than with parenteral routes, such as transdermal testosterone. Testosterone showed no significant effect on depressed mood anxiety, bone mineral density (BMD), or anthropomorphic measures like body weight or body mass index. Conversely, it was associated with a significant incidence of androgenic side effects, including acne and hirsutism (excessive facial/body hair growth). Other androgenic side effects, such as weight gain, pattern hair loss, and voice deepening, were also reported in some trials, but were excluded from analyses due to insufficient data. The overall quality of the evidence was rated as low and was considered to be inconclusive in certain areas, for instance on long-term safety.

A subsequent 2017 systematic review and meta-analysis of studies including over 3,000 postmenopausal women with HSDD similarly found that short-term transdermal testosterone therapy was effective in improving multiple domains of sexual function. Androgenic adverse effects such as acne and hirsutism were significantly greater in incidence with testosterone therapy, whereas no significant differences in "increase in facial hair, alopecia, voice deepening, urinary symptoms, breast pain, headache, site reaction to the patch, total adverse events, serious adverse events, reasons for withdrawal from the study, and the number of women who completed the study" were seen relative to controls.

Although testosterone has been found to be effective at improving sexual function in postmenopausal women, the doses employed have been supraphysiological. In contrast to these high doses, there is little support for the notion that testosterone is a critical hormone for sexual desire and function in women under normal physiological circumstances. Low doses of testosterone resulting in physiological levels of testosterone (<50 ng/dL) have not been found to significantly increase sexual desire or function in women in most studies. Similarly, there appears to be little or no relationship between total or free testosterone levels in the normal physiological range and sexual desire in premenopausal women. Only high doses of testosterone resulting in supraphysiological levels of testosterone (>50 ng/dL) significantly increase sexual desire in women, with levels of testosterone of 80 to 150 ng/dL "slightly" increasing sex drive. In accordance, men experience sexual dysfunction at testosterone levels of below 300 ng/dL, and men that have levels of testosterone of approximately 200 ng/dL frequently experience such problems. The high doses of testosterone required to increase sexual desire in women may have a significant risk of masculinization with long-term therapy. For this reason, and due to the unknown health effects and safety of testosterone therapy, its use may be inappropriate. In 2003, the FDA rejected Intrinsa, a 300 μg/day testosterone patch for the treatment of sexual dysfunction in postmenopausal women. The reasons cited were limited efficacy (about one additional sexually satisfying event per month), concerns about safety and potential adverse effects with long-term therapy, and concerns about inappropriate off-label use. It appears that in women, rather than testosterone, estradiol may be the most important hormone involved in sexual desire, although data on the clinical use of estradiol to increase sexual desire in women is limited.

There are no testosterone products approved for use in women in the United States and many other countries. There are approved testosterone products for women in Australia, where it is considered a drug of dependence, medicines that are subject to misuse and trafficking, and some European countries. Testosterone pellet implants are approved for use in postmenopausal women in the United Kingdom. Testosterone products for men can be used off-label in women in the United States. Alternatively, testosterone products for women are available from compounding pharmacies in the United States, although such products are unregulated and manufacturing quality is not ensured.

Androgen replacement therapy formulations and dosages used in women
Route	Medication	Major brand names	Form	Dosage
Oral	Testosterone undecanoate	Andriol, Jatenzo	Capsule	40–80 mg 1x/1–2 days
Oral	Methyltestosterone	Metandren, Estratest	Tablet	0.5–10 mg/day
Oral	Fluoxymesterone	Halotestin	Tablet	1–2.5 mg 1x/1–2 days
Oral	Normethandrone^{a}	Ginecoside	Tablet	5 mg/day
Oral	Tibolone	Livial	Tablet	1.25–2.5 mg/day
Oral	Prasterone (DHEA)^{b}	–	Tablet	10–100 mg/day
Sublingual	Methyltestosterone	Metandren	Tablet	0.25 mg/day
Transdermal	Testosterone	Intrinsa	Patch	150–300 μg/day
Transdermal	Testosterone	AndroGel	Gel, cream	1–10 mg/day
Vaginal	Prasterone (DHEA)	Intrarosa	Insert	6.5 mg/day
Injection	Testosterone propionate^{a}	Testoviron	Oil solution	25 mg 1x/1–2 weeks
Injection	Testosterone enanthate	Delatestryl, Primodian Depot	Oil solution	25–100 mg 1x/4–6 weeks
Injection	Testosterone cypionate	Depo-Testosterone, Depo-Testadiol	Oil solution	25–100 mg 1x/4–6 weeks
Injection	Testosterone isobutyrate^{a}	Femandren M, Folivirin	Aqueous suspension	25–50 mg 1x/4–6 weeks
Injection	Mixed testosterone esters	Climacteron^{a}	Oil solution	150 mg 1x/4–8 weeks
Injection	Mixed testosterone esters	Omnadren, Sustanon	Oil solution	50–100 mg 1x/4–6 weeks
Injection	Nandrolone decanoate	Deca-Durabolin	Oil solution	25–50 mg 1x/6–12 weeks
Injection	Prasterone enanthate^{a}	Gynodian Depot	Oil solution	200 mg 1x/4–6 weeks
Implant	Testosterone	Testopel	Pellet	50–100 mg 1x/3–6 months
Notes: Premenopausal women produce about 230 ± 70 μg testosterone per day (6.4 ± 2.0 mg testosterone per 4 weeks), with a range of 130 to 330 μg per day (3.6–9.2 mg per 4 weeks). Footnotes: ^{a} = Mostly discontinued or unavailable. ^{b} = Over-the-counter. Sources: See template.

Androgen/anabolic steroid dosages for breast cancer
Route	Medication	Form	Dosage
Oral	Methyltestosterone	Tablet	30–200 mg/day
Oral	Fluoxymesterone	Tablet	10–40 mg 3x/day
Oral	Calusterone	Tablet	40–80 mg 4x/day
Oral	Normethandrone	Tablet	40 mg/day
Buccal	Methyltestosterone	Tablet	25–100 mg/day
Injection (IM or SC)	Testosterone propionate	Oil solution	50–100 mg 3x/week
Injection (IM or SC)	Testosterone enanthate	Oil solution	200–400 mg 1x/2–4 weeks
Injection (IM or SC)	Testosterone cypionate	Oil solution	200–400 mg 1x/2–4 weeks
Injection (IM or SC)	Mixed testosterone esters	Oil solution	250 mg 1x/week
Injection (IM or SC)	Methandriol	Aqueous suspension	100 mg 3x/week
Injection (IM or SC)	Androstanolone (DHT)	Aqueous suspension	300 mg 3x/week
Injection (IM or SC)	Drostanolone propionate	Oil solution	100 mg 1–3x/week
Injection (IM or SC)	Metenolone enanthate	Oil solution	400 mg 3x/week
Injection (IM or SC)	Nandrolone decanoate	Oil solution	50–100 mg 1x/1–3 weeks
Injection (IM or SC)	Nandrolone phenylpropionate	Oil solution	50–100 mg/week
Note: Dosages are not necessarily equivalent. Sources: See template.

=== Available forms ===
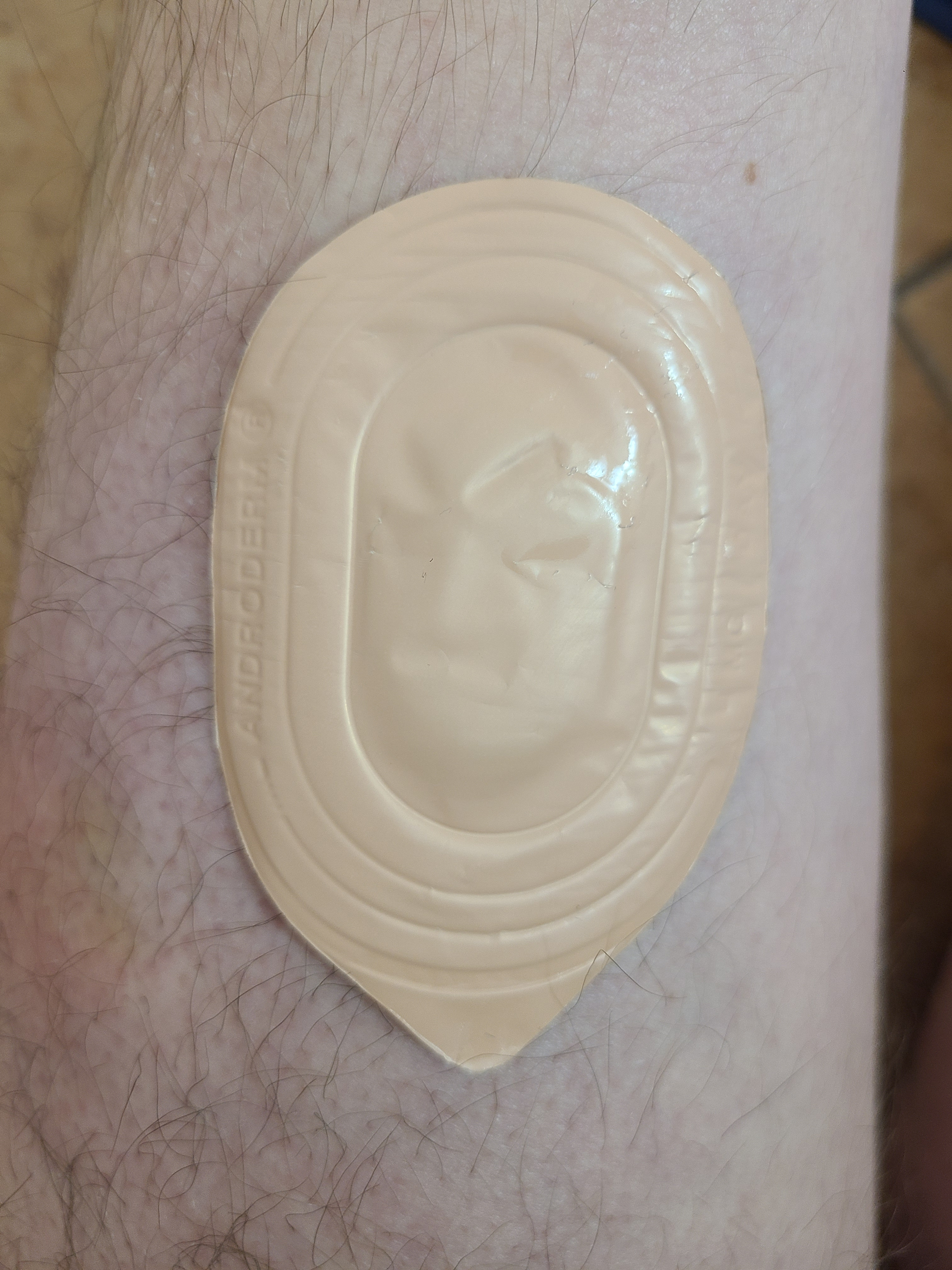
Androderm testosterone skin patch

Testosterone has been marketed for use by oral, sublingual, buccal, intranasal, transdermal (patches), topical (gels), intramuscular (injection), and subcutaneous (implant) administration. It is provided unmodified and as a testosterone ester such as testosterone cypionate, testosterone enanthate, testosterone propionate, or testosterone undecanoate, which act as prodrugs of testosterone. The most common route of administration for testosterone is by intramuscular injection. However, it has been reported that AndroGel, a transdermal gel formulation of testosterone, has become the most popular form of testosterone in androgen replacement therapy for hypogonadism in the United States.

Available forms of testosterone (Note: This table does not include combination products with other medications/hormones. The availability of specific products may vary by country - see Testosterone (medication) § Availability.)
Route	Ingredient	Form	Dose (Note: These dosages may be given at varying frequencies - dosages listed are "each" (ex: per tablet, per spray, etc) and not indicative of total daily dose or equivalent.)	Brand names (Note: Other brand names may be currently or historically marketed.)
Oral	Test. undecanoate	Capsule	40 mg	Andriol, Jatenzo, Kyzatrex, Tlando
Sublingual	Testosterone	Tablet	10 mg	Testoral
Buccal	Testosterone	Tablet	30 mg	Striant
Intranasal	Testosterone	Nasal gel	5.5 mg/spray, 120 sprays	Natesto
Transdermal	Testosterone	Non-scrotal patch	2.5, 4, 5, 6 mg/day	Androderm
Transdermal	Testosterone	Non-scrotal patch	150, 300 μg/day	Intrinsa
Transdermal	Testosterone	Scrotal patch (Note: Potentially discontinued.)	4, 6 mg/day	Testoderm
Transdermal	Testosterone	Topical gel	25, 50, 75, 100, 125 mg/pump	AndroGel, Testim, Fortesta
Transdermal	Testosterone	Axillary solution	30 mg/pump	Axiron
Rectal	Testosterone	Suppository	40 mg	Rektandron
Injection (Note: May be by intramuscular injection or subcutaneous injection.)	Test. enanthate	Oil solution	50, 100, 180, 200, 250 mg/mL	Delatestryl
Injection	Test. cypionate	Oil solution	50, 100, 200, 250 mg/mL	Depo-Testosterone
Injection	Mixed test. esters (Note: Combination of testosterone propionate, testosterone phenylpropionate, testosterone isocaproate, and testosterone decanoate.)	Oil solution	100, 250 mg/mL	Sustanon
Injection	Test. undecanoate	Oil solution	750, 1000 mg	Aveed, Nebido
Implant	Testosterone	Pellet	50, 75, 100, 200 mg	Testopel
Footnotes and sources: Sources:

== Non-medical use ==
=== Athletics ===
Testosterone is used as a form of doping among athletes with the intent to improve performance; accordingly, testosterone is listed on The Prohibited List of the World Anti-Doping Agency as an anabolic agent banned from competitive sports.

After a series of scandals and publicity in the 1980s (such as Ben Johnson's improved performance at the 1988 Summer Olympics), prohibitions of AAS use were renewed or strengthened by many sports organizations. Testosterone and other AAS were designated a "controlled substance" by the United States Congress in 1990, with the Anabolic Steroid Control Act. Their use is seen as an issue in modern sport, particularly given the lengths to which athletes and professional laboratories go to in trying to conceal such use from sports regulators. Steroid use once again came into the spotlight as a result of Canadian professional wrestler Chris Benoit's double murder-suicide in 2007; however, there is no evidence implicating steroid use as a factor in the incident.

Some female athletes may have naturally higher levels of testosterone than others, and may be asked to consent to sex verification and either surgery or drugs to decrease testosterone levels. This has proven contentious, with the Court of Arbitration for Sport suspending the IAAF policy due to insufficient evidence of a link between high androgen levels and improved athletic performance.

==== Detection of abuse ====
A number of methods for detecting testosterone use by athletes have been employed, most based on a urine test. These include the testosterone/epitestosterone ratio (normally less than 6), the testosterone/luteinizing hormone ratio and the carbon-13/carbon-12 ratio (pharmaceutical testosterone contains less carbon-13 than endogenous testosterone). In some testing programs, an individual's own historical results may serve as a reference interval for interpretation of a suspicious finding. Another approach being investigated is the detection of the administered form of testosterone, usually an ester, in hair.

== Contraindications ==
Absolute contraindications of testosterone include prostate cancer, elevated hematocrit (>54%), uncontrolled congestive heart failure, various other cardiovascular diseases, and uncontrolled obstructive sleep apnea. Breast cancer is said by some sources to be an absolute contraindication of testosterone therapy, but androgens including testosterone have also actually been used to treat breast cancer. Relative contraindications of testosterone include elevated prostate-specific antigen (PSA) in men with a high risk of prostate cancer due to ethnicity or family history, severe lower urinary tract symptoms, and elevated hematocrit (>50%).

== Side effects ==
In February 2025, the US Food and Drug Administration (FDA) specified label changes for products containing testosterone. The changes include removing language from the boxed warning related to an increased risk of adverse cardiovascular outcomes and adding a new warning about increased blood pressure.

Adverse effects may also include minor side effects such as oily skin, acne, and seborrhea, as well as loss of scalp hair, which may be prevented or reduced with 5α-reductase inhibitors. In women, testosterone can produce hirsutism (excessive facial/body hair growth), deepening of the voice, and other signs of virilization. Exogenous testosterone may cause suppression of spermatogenesis in men, leading to, in some cases, reversible infertility. Gynecomastia and breast tenderness may occur with high dosages of testosterone due to peripheral conversion of testosterone by aromatase into excessive amounts of the estrogen estradiol. Testosterone treatment, particularly in high dosages, can also be associated with mood changes, increased aggression, increased sex drive, spontaneous erections, and nocturnal emissions.

Other side effects include increased hematocrit, which can require venipuncture in order to treat, and exacerbation of sleep apnea.

The FDA stated in 2015 that neither the benefits nor the safety of testosterone have been established for low testosterone levels due to aging. The FDA has required that testosterone pharmaceutical labels include warning information about the possibility of an increased risk of heart attacks and stroke. They have also required the label include concerns about abuse and dependence.

Injectable forms of testosterone can cause a lung problem called pulmonary oil microembolism (POME). Symptoms of POME include cough, shortness of breath, tightening of the throat, chest pain, sweating, dizziness, and fainting. A postmarketing analysis by the manufacturer of Aveed (testosterone undeconate injection) found that POME occurred at a rate of less than 1% per injection per year for Aveed.

=== Long-term adverse effects ===
==== Cardiovascular disease ====
Results from the TRAVERSE trial were submitted in 2023, concluding that there was no increase in the risk of adverse cardiovascular outcomes in men using testosterone for hypogonadism.

Adverse effects of testosterone supplementation may include increased cardiovascular events (including strokes and heart attacks) and deaths based on three peer-reviewed studies involving men taking testosterone replacement. In addition, an increase of 30% in deaths and heart attacks in older men has been reported. Due to an increased incidence of adverse cardiovascular events compared to a placebo group, a Testosterone in Older Men with Mobility Limitations (TOM) trial (a National Institute of Aging randomized trial) was halted early by the Data Safety and Monitoring Committee. On January 31, 2014, reports of strokes, heart attacks, and deaths in men taking FDA-approved testosterone-replacement led the FDA to announce that it would be investigating the issue. Later, in September 2014, the FDA announced, as a result of the "potential for adverse cardiovascular outcomes", a review of the appropriateness and safety of Testosterone Replacement Therapy (TRT). The FDA now requires warnings in the drug labeling of all approved testosterone products regarding deep vein thrombosis and pulmonary embolism.

Up to the year 2010, studies had not shown any effect on the risk of death, prostate cancer or cardiovascular disease; more recent studies, however, do raise concerns. A 2013 study, published in the Journal of the American Medical Association, reported "the use of testosterone therapy was significantly associated with increased risk of adverse outcomes." The study began after a previous, randomized, clinical trial of testosterone therapy in men was stopped prematurely "due to adverse cardiovascular events raising concerns about testosterone therapy safety."

However, when given to men with hypogonadism in the short- and medium-term, testosterone replacement therapy does not increase the risk of cardiovascular events (including strokes and heart attacks and other heart diseases). The long-term safety of the therapy is not known yet.

==== Benign prostatic hyperplasia ====
Testosterone therapy for patients with late-onset hypogonadism, in addition to increasing risk of cardiovascular disease and prostate cancer, may exacerbate the risk factors associated with benign prostatic hyperplasia, a condition that involves the noncancerous enlargement of the prostate gland, which can lead to urinary symptoms.

==== Prostate cancer ====
Testosterone in the presence of a slow-growing prostate cancer is assumed to increase its growth rate. However, the association between testosterone supplementation and the development of prostate cancer is unproven. Nevertheless, physicians are cautioned about the cancer risk associated with testosterone supplementation.

Testosterone may accelerate pre-existing prostate cancer growth in individuals who have undergone androgen deprivation. It is recommended that physicians screen for prostate cancer with a digital rectal exam and prostate-specific antigen (PSA) level before starting therapy, and monitor PSA and hematocrit levels closely during therapy.

Ethnic groups have different rates of prostate cancer. Differences in sex hormones, including testosterone, have been suggested as an explanation for these differences. This apparent paradox can be resolved by noting that prostate cancer is common. In autopsies, 80% of 80-year-old men have prostate cancer.

=== Pregnancy and breastfeeding ===
Testosterone is contraindicated in pregnancy and not recommended during breastfeeding. Androgens like testosterone are teratogens and are known to cause fetal harm, such as producing virilization and ambiguous genitalia.

== Interactions ==
=== 5α-Reductase inhibitors ===
5α-Reductase inhibitors like finasteride and dutasteride can slightly increase circulating levels of testosterone by inhibiting its metabolism. However, these drugs do this via prevention of the conversion of testosterone into its more potent metabolite dihydrotestosterone (DHT), and this results in dramatically reduced circulating levels of DHT (which circulates at much lower relative concentrations). In addition, local levels of DHT in so-called androgenic (5α-reductase-expressing) tissues are also markedly reduced, and this can have a strong impact on certain effects of testosterone. For instance, growth of body and facial hair and penile growth induced by testosterone may be inhibited by 5α-reductase inhibitors, and this could be considered undesirable in the context of, for instance, puberty induction. On the other hand, 5α-reductase inhibitors may prevent or reduce adverse androgenic side effects of testosterone like scalp hair loss, oily skin, acne, and seborrhea. In addition to the prevention of testosterone conversion into DHT, 5α-reductase inhibitors also prevent the formation of neurosteroids like 3α-androstanediol from testosterone, and this may have neuropsychiatric consequences in some men.

=== Aromatase inhibitors ===
Aromatase inhibitors like anastrozole prevent the conversion of testosterone into estradiol by aromatase. As only a small fraction of testosterone is converted into estradiol, this does not affect testosterone levels, but it can prevent estrogenic side effects like gynecomastia that can occur when testosterone is administered at relatively high dosages. However, estradiol exerts negative feedback on the hypothalamic–pituitary–gonadal axis and, for this reason, prevention of its formation can reduce this feedback and disinhibit gonadal production of testosterone, which in turn can increase levels of endogenous testosterone. Testosterone therapy is sometimes combined with an aromatase inhibitor for men with secondary hypogonadism who wish to conceive children with their partners.

=== Cytochrome P450 inhibitors ===
Inhibitors and inducers of cytochrome P450 enzymes like CYP3A4 have been associated with little or no effect on circulating testosterone levels.

=== Antiandrogens and estrogens ===
Antiandrogens like cyproterone acetate, spironolactone, and bicalutamide can block the androgenic and anabolic effects of testosterone. Estrogens can reduce the effects of testosterone by increasing the hepatic production and in turn circulating levels of sex hormone-binding globulin (SHBG), a carrier protein that binds to and occupies androgens like testosterone and DHT, and thereby reducing free concentrations of these androgens.

== Pharmacology ==
=== Pharmacodynamics ===
Androgenic vs. anabolic activity ratio of androgens/anabolic steroids
Medication	Ratio^{a}
Testosterone	~1:1
Androstanolone (DHT)	~1:1
Methyltestosterone	~1:1
Methandriol	~1:1
Fluoxymesterone	1:1–1:15
Metandienone	1:1–1:8
Drostanolone	1:3–1:4
Metenolone	1:2–1:3
Oxymetholone	1:2–1:9
Oxandrolone	1:13–1:3
Stanozolol	1:1–1:3
Nandrolone	1:3–1:16
Ethylestrenol	1:2–1:19
Norethandrolone	1:1–1:2
Notes: In rodents. Footnotes: ^{a} = Ratio of androgenic to anabolic activity. Sources: See template.

Testosterone is a high affinity ligand for and agonist of the nuclear androgen receptor (AR). In addition, testosterone binds to and activates membrane androgen receptors (mARs) such as GPRC6A and ZIP9. Testosterone is also potentiated via transformation by 5α-reductase into the more potent androgen DHT in so-called androgenic tissues such as the prostate gland, seminal vesicles, skin, and hair follicles. In contrast to the case of testosterone, such potentiation occurs to a reduced extent or not at all with most synthetic AAS (as well as with DHT), and this is primarily responsible for the dissociation of anabolic and androgenic effects with these agents. In addition to DHT, testosterone is converted at a rate of approximately 0.3% into the estrogen estradiol via aromatase. This occurs in many tissues, especially adipose tissue, the liver, and the brain, but primarily in adipose tissue. Testosterone, after conversion into DHT, is also metabolized into 3α-androstanediol, a neurosteroid and potent positive allosteric modulator of the GABA_{A} receptor, and 3β-androstanediol, a potent and preferential agonist of the ERβ. These metabolites, along with estradiol, may be involved in a number of the effects of testosterone in the brain, including its antidepressant, anxiolytic, stress-relieving, rewarding, and pro-sexual effects. Whereas testosterone produced both anabolic and androgenic effects, despite the lack of clear boundaries between these effects, as there is a great deal of mutual overlap between them, the relative potency of these effects exerted by testosterone can depend on various factors and is a topic of ongoing research.

==== Effects in the body and brain ====
The ARs are expressed widely throughout the body, including in the penis, testicles, epididymides, prostate gland, seminal vesicles, fat, skin, bone, bone marrow, muscle, larynx, heart, liver, kidneys, pituitary gland, hypothalamus, and elsewhere throughout the brain. Through activation of the ARs (as well as the mARs), testosterone has many effects, including the following:

- Promotes growth, function, and maintenance of the prostate gland, seminal vesicles, and penis during puberty and thereafter
- Promotes growth and maintenance of muscles, particularly of the upper body
- Causes subcutaneous fat to be deposited in a masculine pattern and decreases overall body fat
- Suppresses breast development induced by estrogens, but can also still produce gynecomastia via excessive conversion into estradiol if levels are too high
- Maintains skin health, integrity, appearance, and hydration and slows the rate of aging of the skin, but can also cause oily skin, acne, and seborrhea
- Promotes the growth of facial and body hair, but can also cause scalp hair loss and hirsutism
- Contributes to bone growth and causes broadening of the shoulders at puberty
- Modulates liver protein synthesis, such as the production of sex hormone-binding globulin and many other proteins
- Increases production of erythropoietin in the kidneys and thereby stimulates red blood cell production in bone marrow and elevates hematocrit
- Exerts negative feedback on the hypothalamic–pituitary–gonadal axis by suppressing the secretion of the gonadotropins follicle-stimulating hormone (FSH) and luteinizing hormone (LH) from the pituitary gland, thereby inhibiting gonadal sex hormone production as well as spermatogenesis and fertility
- Regulates the vasomotor system and body temperature via the hypothalamus, thereby preventing hot flashes
- Modulates brain function, with effects on mood, emotionality, aggression, and sexuality, as well as cognition and memory
- Increases sex drive and erectile capacity and causes spontaneous erections and nocturnal emissions
- Increases the risk of benign prostatic hyperplasia and accelerates the progression of prostate cancer
- Decreases breast proliferation and the risk of breast cancer

=== Pharmacokinetics ===
Testosterone can be taken by a variety of different routes of administration. These include oral, buccal, sublingual, intranasal, transdermal (gels, creams, patches), rectal suppositories), by intramuscular or subcutaneous injection (in oil or aqueous), and as a subcutaneous implant. The pharmacokinetics of testosterone, including its bioavailability, circulating testosterone levels, metabolism, biological half-life, and other parameters, differ by route of administration.

== Chemistry ==
Testosterone is a naturally occurring androstane steroid and is also known by the chemical name androst-4-en-17β-ol-3-one. It has a double bond between the C4 and C5 positions (making it an androstene), a ketone group at the C3 position, and a hydroxyl (alcohol) group at the C17β position.

=== Derivatives ===
Testosterone esters are substituted at the C17β position with a lipophilic fatty acid ester moiety of varying chain length. Major testosterone esters include testosterone cypionate, testosterone enanthate, testosterone propionate, and testosterone undecanoate. A C17β ether prodrug of testosterone, cloxotestosterone acetate, has also been marketed, although it is little known and is used rarely or no longer. Another C17β ether prodrug of testosterone, silandrone, also exists but was never marketed, and is notable in that it is orally active. In addition to ester and ether prodrugs, androgen prohormones or precursors of testosterone, such as dehydroepiandrosterone (DHEA), androstenediol, and androstenedione, exist as well, and convert into testosterone to variable extents upon oral ingestion. Unlike testosterone ester and ether prodrugs however, these prohormones are only weakly androgenic/anabolic.

All synthetic AAS are derivatives of testosterone. Prominent examples include nandrolone (19-nortestosterone), metandienone (17α-methyl-δ^{1}-testosterone), and stanozolol (a 17α-alkylated derivative of DHT). Unlike testosterone, AAS that are 17α-alkylated, like metandienone and stanozolol, are orally active. This is due to steric hindrance of C17β-position metabolism during the first-pass through the liver. In contrast, most AAS that are not 17α-alkylated, like nandrolone, are not active orally, and must instead be administered via intramuscular injection. This is almost always in ester form; for instance, in the case of nandrolone, as nandrolone decanoate or nandrolone phenylpropionate.

Structural properties of major testosterone esters
Androgen	Structure	Ester				Relative mol. weight	Relative T content^{b}	logP^{c}
Androgen	Structure	Position(s)	Moiet(ies)	Type	Length^{a}	Relative mol. weight	Relative T content^{b}	logP^{c}
Testosterone		–	–	–	–	1.00	1.00	3.0–3.4
Testosterone propionate		C17β	Propanoic acid	Straight-chain fatty acid	3	1.19	0.84	3.7–4.9
Testosterone isobutyrate		C17β	Isobutyric acid	Branched-chain fatty acid	– (~3)	1.24	0.80	4.9–5.3
Testosterone isocaproate		C17β	Isohexanoic acid	Branched-chain fatty acid	– (~5)	1.34	0.75	4.4–6.3
Testosterone caproate		C17β	Hexanoic acid	Straight-chain fatty acid	6	1.35	0.75	5.8–6.5
Testosterone phenylpropionate		C17β	Phenylpropanoic acid	Aromatic fatty acid	– (~6)	1.46	0.69	5.8–6.5
Testosterone cypionate		C17β	Cyclopentylpropanoic acid	Cyclic carboxylic acid	– (~6)	1.43	0.70	5.1–7.0
Testosterone enanthate		C17β	Heptanoic acid	Straight-chain fatty acid	7	1.39	0.72	3.6–7.0
Testosterone decanoate		C17β	Decanoic acid	Straight-chain fatty acid	10	1.53	0.65	6.3–8.6
Testosterone undecanoate		C17β	Undecanoic acid	Straight-chain fatty acid	11	1.58	0.63	6.7–9.2
Testosterone buciclate^{d}		C17β	Bucyclic acid^{e}	Cyclic carboxylic acid	– (~9)	1.58	0.63	7.9–8.5
Footnotes: ^{a} = Length of ester in carbon atoms for straight-chain fatty acids or approximate length of ester in carbon atoms for aromatic or cyclic fatty acids. ^{b} = Relative testosterone content by weight (i.e., relative androgenic/anabolic potency). ^{c} = Experimental or predicted octanol/water partition coefficient (i.e., lipophilicity/hydrophobicity). Retrieved from PubChem, ChemSpider, and DrugBank. ^{d} = Never marketed. ^{e} = Bucyclic acid = trans-4-Butylcyclohexane-1-carboxylic acid. Sources: See individual articles.

== History ==
Testosterone was first isolated and synthesized in 1935. Shortly thereafter, in 1937, testosterone first became commercially available as a pharmaceutical drug in the form of pellets and then in ester form for intramuscular injection as the relatively short-acting testosterone propionate. Methyltestosterone, one of the first synthetic AAS and orally active androgens, was introduced in 1935, but was associated with hepatotoxicity and eventually became largely medically obsolete. In the mid-1950s, the longer-acting testosterone esters testosterone enanthate and testosterone cypionate were introduced. They largely superseded testosterone propionate and became the major testosterone esters used medically for over half a century. In the 1970s, testosterone undecanoate was introduced for oral use in Europe, although intramuscular testosterone undecanoate had already been in use in China for several years. Intramuscular testosterone undecanoate was not introduced in Europe and the United States until much later (in the early to mid 2000s and 2014, respectively).

The history of testosterone as a medication has been reviewed.

== Society and culture ==
=== Usage ===
In the US in the 2000s, companies and figures in the popular media have heavily marketed notions of "andropause" as something parallel to menopause; these notions have been rejected by the medical community. Additionally, advertising from drug companies selling testosterone and human growth hormone, as well as dietary supplement companies selling all kinds of "boosters" for aging men, have emphasized the "need" of middle-aged or aging men for testosterone. There is a medical condition called late-onset hypogonadism; according to Thomas Perls and David J. Handelsman, writing in a 2015 editorial in the Journal of the American Geriatrics Society, it appears that this condition is overdiagnosed and overtreated. Perls and Handelsman note that in the US, "sales of testosterone increased from $324 million in 2002 to $2 billion in 2012, and the number of testosterone doses prescribed climbed from 100 million in 2007 to half a billion in 2012, not including the additional contributions from compounding pharmacies, Internet, and direct-to-patient clinic sales."

=== Generic names ===
Testosterone is the generic name of testosterone in English and Italian and the INN, USAN, USP, BAN, and DCIT of the drug, while testostérone is its French name and the DCF. It is also referred to in Latin as testosteronum, in Spanish and Portuguese as testosterona, and in German, Dutch, and Russian and other Slavic languages as testosteron. The Cyrillic script of testosterone is тестостерон.

=== Brand names ===
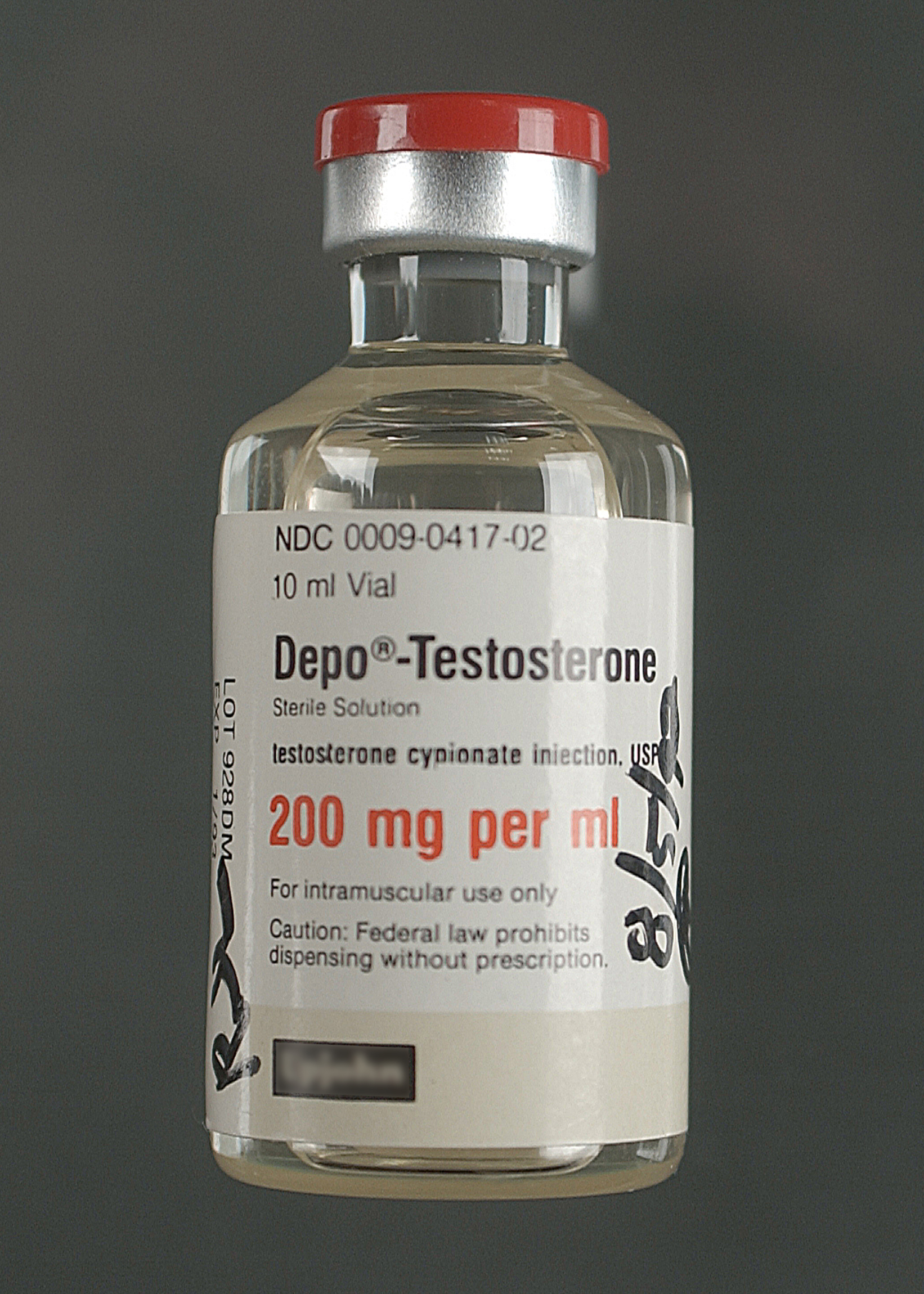
A vial of Depo-Testosterone (testosterone cypionate in oil) for intramuscular injection

Testosterone is marketed under a large number of brand names throughout the world. Major brand names of testosterone and/or its esters include Andriol, Androderm, AndroGel, Axiron, Delatestryl, Depo-Testosterone, Intrinsa, Nebido, Omnadren, Primoteston, Sustanon, Testim, TestoGel, TestoPatch, Testoviron, and Tostran.

=== Availability ===
==== United States ====
As of November 2016, unmodified (non-esterified) testosterone is available in the United States in the following formulations:

- Topical gels: AndroGel, Fortesta, Testim, Testosterone (generic)
- Topical solutions: Axiron, Testosterone (generic)
- Transdermal patches: Androderm, Testoderm (discontinued), Testoderm TTS (discontinued), Testosterone (generic)
- Intranasal gels: Natesto
- Buccal tablets: Striant
- Pellet implants: Testopel

And the following ester prodrugs of testosterone are available in the United States in oil solutions for intramuscular injection:

- Testosterone cypionate: Depo-Testosterone, Testosterone Cypionate (generic)
- Testosterone enanthate: Delatestryl, Xyosted (auto-injector), Testosterone Enanthate (generic)
- Testosterone propionate: Testosterone Propionate (generic)
- Testosterone undecanoate: Aveed

Unmodified testosterone was also formerly available for intramuscular injection but was discontinued.

Testosterone cypionate and testosterone enanthate were formerly available in combination with estradiol cypionate and estradiol valerate, respectively, under the brand names Depo-Testadiol and Ditate-DS, respectively, as oil solutions for intramuscular injection, but these formulations have been discontinued.

Unlike in Europe, Canada, and much of the rest of the world, oral testosterone undecanoate is not available in the United States.

==== Canada ====
As of November 2016, testosterone is available in Canada in the form of topical gels (AndroGel, Testim), topical solutions (Axiron), transdermal patches (Androderm), and intranasal gels (Natesto). Testosterone cypionate (Depo-Testosterone, Testosterone Cypionate (generic)), testosterone enanthate (Delatestryl, PMS-Testosterone Enanthate), and testosterone propionate (Testosterone Propionate (generic)) are available as oil solutions for intramuscular injection and testosterone undecanoate (Andriol, PMS-Testosterone, Taro-Testosterone) is available in the form of oral capsules. Testosterone buccal tablets and pellet implants do not appear to be available in Canada.

==== Other countries ====
Testosterone and/or its esters are widely available in countries throughout the world in a variety of formulations.

=== Legal status ===
Testosterone and its esters, along with other AAS, are prescription-only controlled substances in many countries throughout the world. In the United States, they are Schedule III drugs under the Controlled Substances Act, in Canada, they are Schedule IV drugs under the Controlled Drugs and Substances Act, and in the United Kingdom, they are Class C drugs under the Misuse of Drugs Act.

=== Litigation ===
As of 2014, a number of lawsuits are underway against manufacturers of testosterone, alleging a significantly increased rate of stroke and heart attack in elderly men who use testosterone supplementation.

=== Doping in sports ===
There are many known cases of doping in sports with testosterone and its esters by professional athletes.

== Research ==
=== Depression ===
A 2018 meta-analysis concluded that testosterone treatment is associated with a modest reduction in depressive symptoms in men, especially at higher doses and in carefully selected populations. A 2014 meta-analysis found that testosterone improves mood, especially in middle-aged hypogonadal men with subthreshold depression, but shows limited effect in older or eugonadal men. A 2009 review found that testosterone had an antidepressant effect in men with depression, especially those with hypogonadism, HIV/AIDS, and in the elderly.

=== Heart failure ===
Testosterone replacement can significantly improve exercise capacity, muscle strength and reduce QT intervals in men with chronic heart failure (CHF). Over the 3 to 6-month course of the studies reviewed, testosterone therapy appeared safe and generally effective, and (ruling out prostate cancer) the authors found no justification to absolutely restrict its use in men with CHF. A similar 2012 review also found increased exercise capacity and reasoned the benefits generlizable to women. However, both reviews advocate larger, longer term, randomized controlled trials.

=== Male contraception ===
Testosterone, as esters such as testosterone undecanoate or testosterone buciclate, has been studied and promoted as a male contraceptive analogous to estrogen-based contraceptives in women. Otherwise considered an adverse effect of testosterone, reduced spermatogenesis can be further suppressed with the addition of a progestin such as norethisterone enanthate or levonorgestrel butanoate, improving the contraceptive effect.

=== Anorgasmia ===
Testosterone is under development in a low-dose intranasal formulation for the treatment of anorgasmia in women.

=== Miscellaneous ===
Testosterone therapy may improve the management of type 2 diabetes. Low testosterone has been associated with the development of Alzheimer's disease.

Topical androgens like testosterone have been used and studied in the treatment of cellulite in women.
