= Nandrolone cyclotate =

Chemical compound

Clinical data
- Other names: Nandrolone ciclotate; RS-3268R; 19-Nortestosterone 17β-ciclotate
- Routes of administration: Intramuscular injection
- Drug class: Androgen; Anabolic steroid; Androgen ester; Progestogen

Identifiers
- IUPAC name: [(8R,9S,10R,13S,14S,17S)-13-methyl-3-oxo-2,6,7,8,9,10,11,12,14,15,16,17-dodecahydro-1H-cyclopenta[a]phenanthren-17-yl] 1-methylbicyclo[2.2.2]oct-2-ene-4-carboxylate
- CAS Number: 22263-51-0
- PubChem CID: 164526
- ChemSpider: 32700233
- UNII: 1MG9GW4ZH8
- CompTox Dashboard (EPA): DTXSID2023351

Chemical and physical data
- Formula: C_{28}H_{38}O_{3}
- Molar mass: 422.609 g·mol^{−1}
- 3D model (JSmol): Interactive image
- SMILES: C[C@@]12C=C[C@@](CC1)(CC2)C(=O)O[C@@H]3[C@@]4([C@H]([C@H]5[C@@H]([C@@H]6C(=CC(=O)CC6)CC5)CC4)CC3)C
- InChI: InChI=1S/C28H38O3/c1-26-11-14-28(15-12-26,16-13-26)25(30)31-24-8-7-23-22-5-3-18-17-19(29)4-6-20(18)21(22)9-10-27(23,24)2/h11,14,17,20-24H,3-10,12-13,15-16H2,1-2H3/t20-,21+,22+,23-,24-,26-,27-,28-/m0/s1; Key:REACBNMPQDINOF-ZDMPKJLCSA-N

Nandrolone cyclotate (USAN) (developmental code name RS-3268R), or nandrolone ciclotate, also known as 19-nortestosterone 17β-ciclotate, is a synthetic and injected anabolic–androgenic steroid (AAS) of the nandrolone (19-nortestosterone) group which was never marketed. It is an androgen ester – specifically, the C17β ciclotate (4-methylbicyclo[2.2.2]oct-2-ene-1-carboxylate) ester of nandrolone. Nandrolone cyclotate has potent and prolonged activity as an AAS when administered by intramuscular injection and is reported to have a similar duration of action to that of nandrolone decanoate via this route.

Relative affinities (%) of nandrolone and related steroids
| Compound | PR | AR | ER | GR | MR | SHBG | CBG |
|---|---|---|---|---|---|---|---|
| Nandrolone | 20 | 154–155 | <0.1 | 0.5 | 1.6 | 1–16 | 0.1 |
| Testosterone | 1.0–1.2 | 100 | <0.1 | 0.17 | 0.9 | 19–82 | 3–8 |
| Estradiol | 2.6 | 7.9 | 100 | 0.6 | 0.13 | 8.7–12 | <0.1 |
Notes: Values are percentages (%). Reference ligands (100%) were progesterone for the PR, testosterone for the AR, estradiol for the ER, dexamethasone for the GR, aldosterone for the MR, dihydrotestosterone for SHBG, and cortisol for CBG. Sources: See template.

== See also ==
- List of androgen esters § Nandrolone esters
