= C19H28O5S =

The molecular formula C_{19}H_{28}O_{5}S (molar mass: 368.488 g/mol) may refer to:

- Dehydroepiandrosterone sulfate, or DHEA-S
- Testosterone sulfate
