= Testosterone sulfate =

Names
- IUPAC name 3-Oxoandrost-4-en-17β-yl hydrogen sulfate
- Systematic IUPAC name (1S,3aS,3bR,9aR,9bS,11aS)-9a,11a-Dimethyl-7-oxo-2,3,3a,3b,4,5,7,8,9,9a,9b,10,11,11a-tetradecahydro-1H-cyclopenta[a]phenanthren-1-yl hydrogen sulfate
- Other names Testosterone 17β-sulfate; Testosterone 17β-sulfuric acid; 17β-(Sulfooxy)androst-4-en-3-one

Identifiers
| CAS Number | 651-45-6 |
| 3D model (JSmol) | Interactive image |
| ChEBI | CHEBI:84094 |
| ChemSpider | 106493 |
| PubChem CID | 119207 |
| UNII | KYZ4XM82XB |
| CompTox Dashboard (EPA) | DTXSID201315151 |
- InChI: InChI=1S/C19H28O5S/c1-18-9-7-13(20)11-12(18)3-4-14-15-5-6-17(24-25(21,22)23)19(15,2)10-8-16(14)18/h11,14-17H,3-10H2,1-2H3,(H,21,22,23)/t14-,15-,16-,17-,18-,19-/m0/s1 Key: WAQBISPOEAOCOG-DYKIIFRCSA-N
- SMILES: C[C@]12CC[C@H]3[C@H]([C@@H]1CC[C@@H]2OS(=O)(=O)O)CCC4=CC(=O)CC[C@]34C

Properties
| Chemical formula | C_{19}H_{28}O_{5}S |
| Molar mass | 368.488 g/mol |
- Except where otherwise noted, data are given for materials in their standard state (at 25 °C [77 °F], 100 kPa). Infobox references

Testosterone sulfate is an endogenous, naturally occurring steroid and minor urinary metabolite of testosterone.

== See also ==
- Androstanediol glucuronide
- Androsterone glucuronide
- Etiocholanolone glucuronide
- Testosterone glucuronide
