= Ciclotic acid =

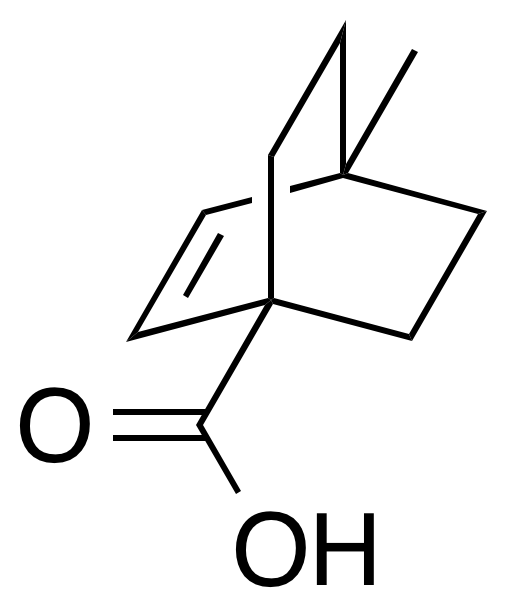

Names
- IUPAC name 4-Methylbicyclo[2.2.2]oct-2-ene-1-carboxylic acid
- Other names Ciclotic acid, ciclotate, cyclotate

Identifiers
CAS Number	14233-92-2
3D model (JSmol)	Interactive image
ChemSpider	58178411
PubChem CID	21872020
UNII	MH56Q8PEU9
- InChI: InChI=1S/C10H14O2/c1-9-2-5-10(6-3-9,7-4-9)8(11)12/h2,5H,3-4,6-7H2,1H3,(H,11,12)/t9-,10- Key: AMMPLVWPWSYRDR-MGCOHNPYSA-N
- SMILES: C[C@@]12C=C[C@@](CC1)(CC2)C(=O)O

Properties
Chemical formula	C_{10}H_{14}O_{2}
Molar mass	166.220 g·mol^{−1}
- Except where otherwise noted, data are given for materials in their standard state (at 25 °C [77 °F], 100 kPa). Infobox references

Ciclotic acid, or cyclotic acid, systematic name 4-methylbicyclo[2.2.2]oct-2-ene-1-carboxylic acid, is a bicyclic carboxylic acid. The salts and esters of ciclotic acid are known as ciclotates (cyclotates). An example is nandrolone cyclotate, a long-acting ester prodrug of the anabolic-androgenic steroid nandrolone.

== See also ==
- Buciclic acid
