= Testosterone 17beta-dehydrogenase =

testosterone 17-beta-dehydrogenase (NADP^{+})

Identifiers
- EC no.: 1.1.1.64
- CAS no.: 9028-63-1

Databases
- IntEnz: IntEnz view
- BRENDA: BRENDA entry
- ExPASy: NiceZyme view
- KEGG: KEGG entry
- MetaCyc: metabolic pathway
- PRIAM: profile
- PDB structures: RCSB PDB PDBe PDBsum
- Gene Ontology: AmiGO / QuickGO
Search
- PMC: articles
- PubMed: articles
- NCBI: proteins

In enzymology, a testosterone 17beta-dehydrogenase is an enzyme that catalyzes the interconversion of testosterone and androstenedione.

Testosterone
+ NADP^{+}
H^{+}
H^{+}
Androstenedione
+ NADPH

This enzyme belongs to the family of oxidoreductases, specifically those acting on the CH-OH group of donor with NAD^{+} or NADP^{+} as acceptor.

== Names ==
The systematic name of this enzyme class is 17beta-hydroxysteroid:NAD^{+} 17-oxidoreductase. Other names in common use include 17-ketoreductase and 17beta-HSD. This enzyme participates in androgen and estrogen metabolism.

== Variants ==
There are two variants of the enzyme, one that uses NADP^{+} as cofactor, and one that uses NAD^{+} instead.

=== NAD^{+} ===
This variant of testosterone 17beta-dehydrogenase (EC 1.1.1.239) uses the cofactor oxidised nicotinamide adenine dinucleotide.

=== NADP^{+} ===
This variant of testosterone 17beta-dehydrogenase (EC 1.1.1.64) uses the cofactor oxidised nicotinamide adenine dinucleotide phosphate.

== See also ==
- Testosterone glucuronide
