= Cloxotestosterone =

Chemical compound

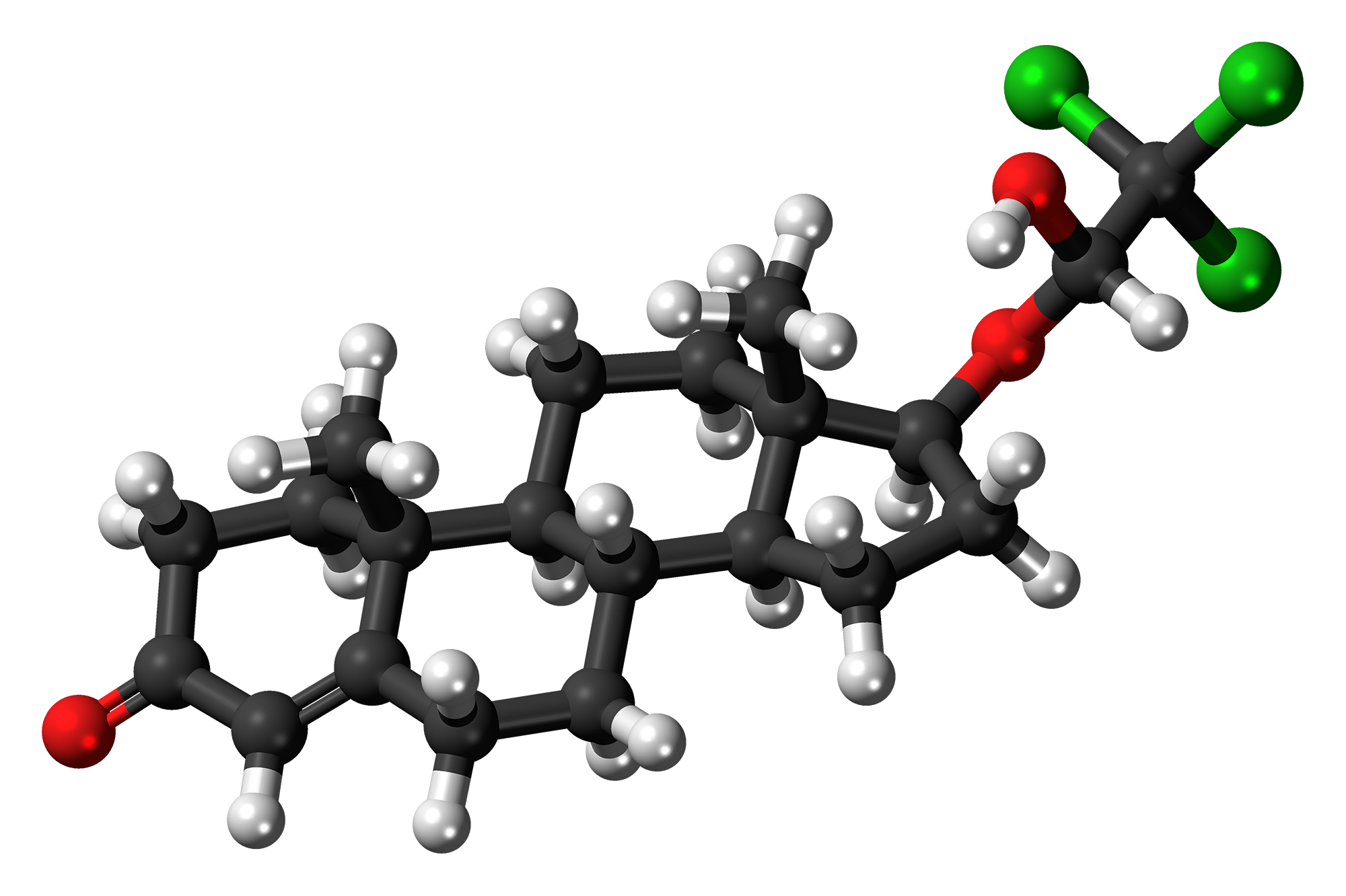

Clinical data
- Other names: 17β-Chloral hemiacetal testosterone; (17β)-17-(2,2,2-Trichloro-1-hydroxyethoxy)androst-4-en-3-one

Identifiers
- IUPAC name: (8R,9S,10R,13S,14S,17S)-10,13-dimethyl-17-(2,2,2-trichloro-1-hydroxyethoxy)-1,2,6,7,8,9,11,12,14,15,16,17-dodecahydrocyclopenta[a]phenanthren-3-one
- CAS Number: 53608-96-1
- PubChem CID: 20055048
- ChemSpider: 16736057
- UNII: 8422DH508N
- ChEMBL: ChEMBL2106514
- CompTox Dashboard (EPA): DTXSID801016517

Chemical and physical data
- Formula: C_{21}H_{29}Cl_{3}O_{3}
- Molar mass: 435.81 g·mol^{−1}
- 3D model (JSmol): Interactive image
- SMILES: C[C@]12CC[C@H]3[C@H]([C@@H]1CC[C@@H]2OC(C(Cl)(Cl)Cl)O)CCC4=CC(=O)CC[C@]34C
- InChI: InChI=1S/C21H29Cl3O3/c1-19-9-7-13(25)11-12(19)3-4-14-15-5-6-17(27-18(26)21(22,23)24)20(15,2)10-8-16(14)19/h11,14-18,26H,3-10H2,1-2H3/t14-,15-,16-,17-,18?,19-,20-/m0/s1; Key:DNADMXUXHNLBKR-SIGPKOBDSA-N

Cloxotestosterone (INN), also known as 17β-chloral hemiacetal testosterone, is a synthetic anabolic–androgenic steroid (AAS) and an androgen ether – specifically, the 17β-trichloro hemiacetal ether of testosterone – which was never marketed. The O-acetate ester of cloxotestosterone, cloxotestosterone acetate (brand name Caprosem), in contrast to cloxotestosterone, has been marketed.

== See also ==
- List of androgen esters
