= Testosterone glucuronide =

Names
- IUPAC name 3-Oxoandrost-4-en-17β-yl β-D-glucopyranosiduronic acid
- Systematic IUPAC name (2S,3S,4S,5R,6R)-3,4,5-Trihydroxy-6-{[(1S,3aS,3bR,9aR,9bS,11aS)-9a,11a-dimethyl-7-oxo-2,3,3a,3b,4,5,7,8,9,9a,9b,10,11,11a-tetradecahydro-1H-cyclopenta[a]phenanthren-1-yl]oxy}oxane-2-carboxylic acid
- Other names Androst-4-en-17β-ol-3-one 17β-D-glucuronide

Identifiers
CAS Number	1180-25-2
3D model (JSmol)	Interactive image
ChEBI	CHEBI:28835
ChemSpider	97270
ECHA InfoCard	100.162.205
KEGG	C11134
PubChem CID	108192
CompTox Dashboard (EPA)	DTXSID00904352
- InChI: InChI=1S/C25H36O8/c1-24-9-7-13(26)11-12(24)3-4-14-15-5-6-17(25(15,2)10-8-16(14)24)32-23-20(29)18(27)19(28)21(33-23)22(30)31/h11,14-21,23,27-29H,3-10H2,1-2H3,(H,30,31)/t14-,15-,16-,17-,18-,19-,20+,21-,23+,24-,25-/m0/s1 Key: NIKZPECGCSUSBV-HMAFJQTKSA-N
- SMILES: [H][C@@]12CC[C@H](O[C@@H]3O[C@@H]([C@@H](O)[C@H](O)[C@H]3O)C(O)=O)[C@@]1(C)CC[C@@]1([H])[C@@]2([H])CCC2=CC(=O)CC[C@]12C

Properties
Chemical formula	C_{25}H_{36}O_{8}
Molar mass	464.555 g/mol
- Except where otherwise noted, data are given for materials in their standard state (at 25 °C [77 °F], 100 kPa). Infobox references

Testosterone glucuronide is an endogenous, naturally occurring steroid and minor urinary metabolite of testosterone.

== Formation ==
Glucuronosyltransferase enzymes convert testosterone to its glucuronide by adding a sugar acid at the hydroxy group, with uridine diphosphate (UDP) as byproduct:

testosterone
+ UDP-glucuronate
UDP
testosterone glucuronide

== See also ==
- Androstanediol glucuronide
- Androsterone glucuronide
- Etiocholanolone glucuronide
- Testosterone sulfate
