= Estradiol 17beta-dehydrogenase =

estradiol 17-beta-dehydrogenase

Identifiers
- EC no.: 1.1.1.62
- CAS no.: 9028-61-9

Databases
- IntEnz: IntEnz view
- BRENDA: BRENDA entry
- ExPASy: NiceZyme view
- KEGG: KEGG entry
- MetaCyc: metabolic pathway
- PRIAM: profile
- PDB structures: RCSB PDB PDBe PDBsum
- Gene Ontology: AmiGO / QuickGO
Search
- PMC: articles
- PubMed: articles
- NCBI: proteins

In enzymology, an estradiol 17beta-dehydrogenase (EC 1.1.1.62) is an enzyme that catalyzes the chemical reaction

Estradiol
+ NAD^{+}
H^{+}
H^{+}
Estrone
+ NADH

The two substrates of this enzyme are estradiol and oxidised nicotinamide adenine dinucleotide (NAD^{+}). Its products are estrone, reduced NADH, and a proton. The enzyme can alternatively use nicotinamide adenine dinucleotide phosphate as its cofactor.

This enzyme belongs to the family of oxidoreductases, specifically those acting on the CH-OH group of donor with NAD^{+} or NADP^{+} as acceptor. The systematic name of this enzyme class is estradiol-17beta:NAD(P)^{+} 17-oxidoreductase. Other names in common use include 20alpha-hydroxysteroid dehydrogenase, 17beta,20alpha-hydroxysteroid dehydrogenase, 17beta-estradiol dehydrogenase, estradiol dehydrogenase, estrogen 17-oxidoreductase, and 17beta-HSD. This enzyme participates in androgen and estrogen metabolism.

== Structural studies ==
As of late 2007, 29 structures have been solved for this class of enzymes, with PDB accession codes 1A27, 1BHS, 1DHT, 1EQU, 1FDS, 1FDT, 1FDU, 1FDV, 1FDW, 1GZ6, 1I5R, 1IKT, 1IOL, 1JTV, 1QYV, 1QYW, 1QYX, 1S1P, 1S1R, 1S2A, 1S2C, 1XF0, 1YB1, 1ZQ5, 2F38, 2FGB, 2HQ1, 2PD6, and 3DHE.
