= Cloxotestosterone acetate =

Chemical compound

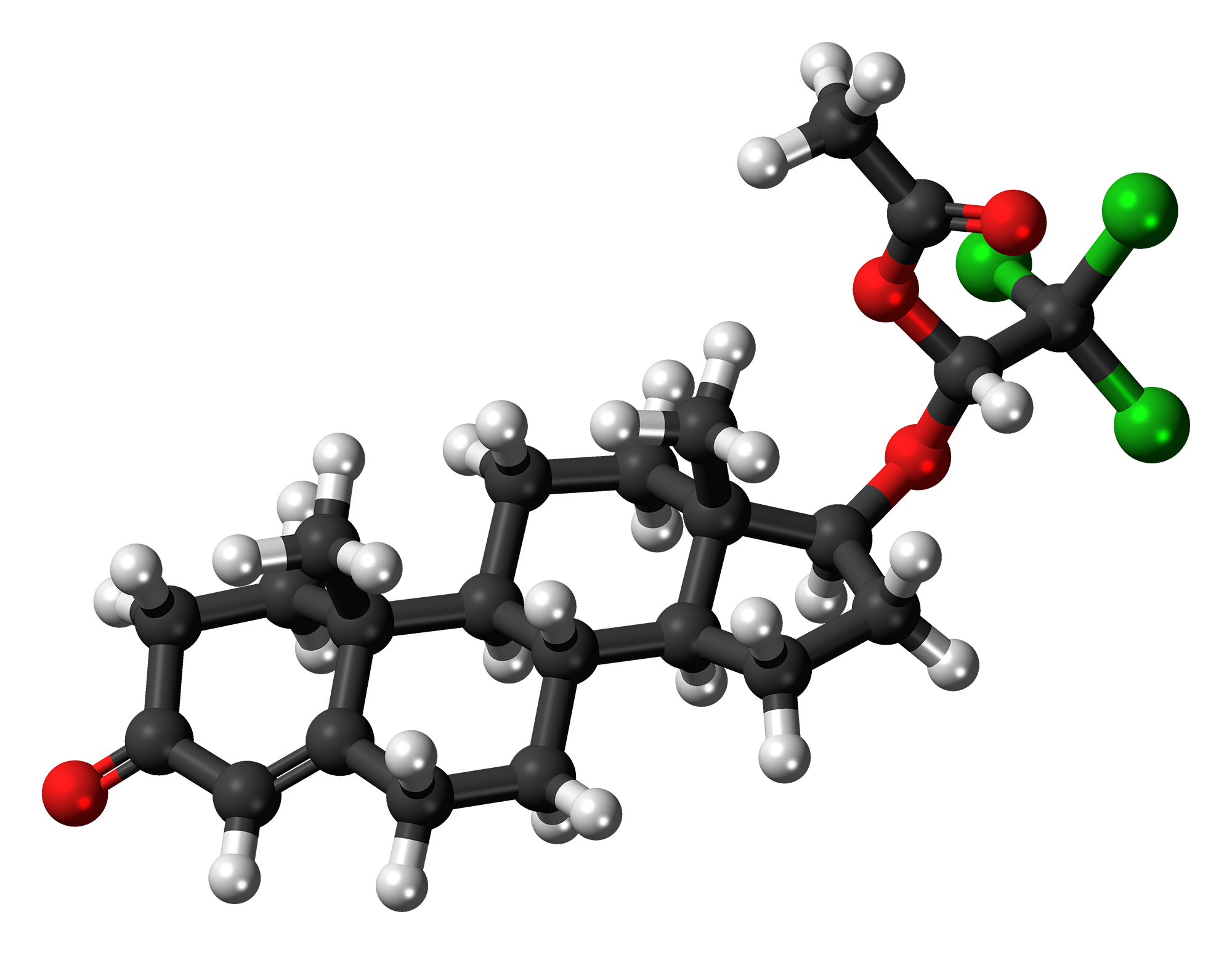

Clinical data
- Trade names: Caprosem
- Other names: Testosterone 17β-chloral hemiacetal O-acetate; 17β-(1-(Acetyloxy)-2,2,2-trichloroethoxy)androst-4-en-3-one
- Routes of administration: Intramuscular injection

Identifiers
- IUPAC name: [2,2,2-trichloro-1-[[(8R,9S,10R,13S,14S,17S)-10,13-dimethyl-3-oxo-1,2,6,7,8,9,11,12,14,15,16,17-dodecahydrocyclopenta[a]phenanthren-17-yl]oxy]ethyl] acetate
- CAS Number: 13867-82-8
- PubChem CID: 20056698
- ChemSpider: 16739648
- UNII: 2X9YIP66ZO
- CompTox Dashboard (EPA): DTXSID001170741

Chemical and physical data
- Formula: C_{23}H_{31}Cl_{3}O_{4}
- Molar mass: 477.85 g·mol^{−1}
- 3D model (JSmol): Interactive image
- SMILES: CC(=O)OC(C(Cl)(Cl)Cl)O[C@H]1CC[C@@H]2[C@@]1(CC[C@H]3[C@H]2CCC4=CC(=O)CC[C@]34C)C
- InChI: InChI=1S/C23H31Cl3O4/c1-13(27)29-20(23(24,25)26)30-19-7-6-17-16-5-4-14-12-15(28)8-10-21(14,2)18(16)9-11-22(17,19)3/h12,16-20H,4-11H2,1-3H3/t16-,17-,18-,19-,20?,21-,22-/m0/s1; Key:SJWGVEPLFJGWNB-UWSXKFMVSA-N

Cloxotestosterone acetate (INN; brand name Caprosem), also known as testosterone 17β-chloral hemiacetal O-acetate, is a synthetic, injected anabolic–androgenic steroid (AAS) and an androgen ether and ester – specifically, the O-acetate ester of cloxotestosterone, the 17β-trichloro hemiacetal ether of testosterone. It is administered via intramuscular injection, as a 100 mg, 2 mL aqueous suspension and lasts 4 to 6 weeks with a single administration. The drug was first marketed in the early 1960s.

== See also ==
- List of androgen esters
