= Buciclic acid =

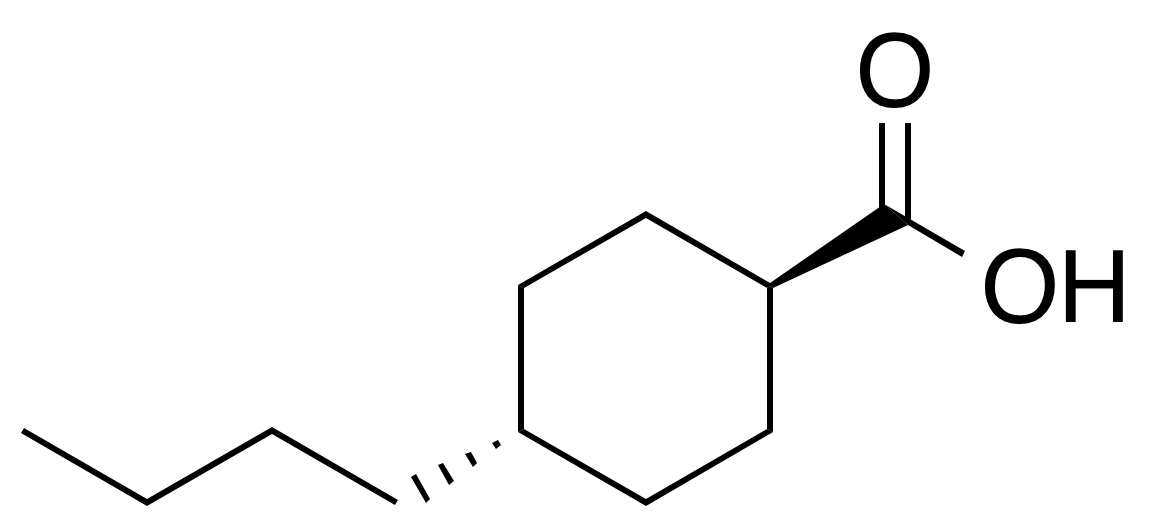

Names
- IUPAC name trans-4-butylcyclohexane-1-carboxylic acid
- Other names Bucyclic acid, buciclate, bucyclate

Identifiers
| CAS Number | 38289-28-0 |
| 3D model (JSmol) | Interactive image |
| ChemSpider | 1553064 |
| ECHA InfoCard | 100.203.068 |
| PubChem CID | 2060518 |
| UNII | C8XG78Y2T5 |
| CompTox Dashboard (EPA) | DTXSID50959211 |
- InChI: InChI=1S/C11H20O2/c1-2-3-4-9-5-7-10(8-6-9)11(12)13/h9-10H,2-8H2,1H3,(H,12,13) Key: BALGERHMIXFENA-UHFFFAOYSA-N
- SMILES: CCCCC1CCC(CC1)C(=O)O

Properties
| Chemical formula | C_{11}H_{20}O_{2} |
| Molar mass | 184.279 g/mol |
- Except where otherwise noted, data are given for materials in their standard state (at 25 °C [77 °F], 100 kPa). Infobox references

Buciclic acid, or bucyclic acid, systematic name trans-4-butylcyclohexane-1-carboxylic acid, is a simple alkyl-substituted cyclohexanecarboxylic acid. The salts and esters of buciclic acid are known as buciclates (bucyclates). Pharmaceutical examples of esters of this acid include testosterone buciclate, a long-acting prodrug of the androgen testosterone, and dimethandrolone buciclate, a prodrug of dimethandrolone.

== See also ==
- Ciclotic acid
