= Etiocholanolone glucuronide =

Names
- IUPAC name 17-Oxo-5β-androstan-3α-yl β-D-glucopyranosiduronic acid
- Systematic IUPAC name (2S,3S,4S,5R,6R)-6-{[(3aS,3bR,5aR,7R,9aS,9bS,11aS)-9a,11a-Dimethyl-1-oxohexadecahydro-1H-cyclopenta[a]phenanthren-7-yl]oxy}-3,4,5-trihydroxyoxane-2-carboxylic acid
- Other names 5β-Androstan-3α-ol-17-one 3-glucuronide; 3α-Hydroxy-5β-androstan-17-one 3-glucuronide; Etiocholan-3α-ol-17-one 3-glucuronide; 3α-Hydroxyetiocholan-17-one 3-glucuronide; 17-oxoetiocholan-3α-yl β-D-glucopyranosiduronic acid

Identifiers
CAS Number	3602-09-3
3D model (JSmol)	Interactive image
ChEBI	CHEBI:37451
ChemSpider	391377
KEGG	C11136
PubChem CID	443078
UNII	9LK4DML9R2
CompTox Dashboard (EPA)	DTXSID201335941
- InChI: InChI=1S/C25H38O8/c1-24-9-7-13(32-23-20(29)18(27)19(28)21(33-23)22(30)31)11-12(24)3-4-14-15-5-6-17(26)25(15,2)10-8-16(14)24/h12-16,18-21,23,27-29H,3-11H2,1-2H3,(H,30,31)/t12-,13-,14+,15+,16+,18+,19+,20-,21+,23-,24+,25+/m1/s1 Key: VFUIRAVTUVCQTF-SDHZCXLISA-N
- SMILES: C[C@]12CC[C@H](C[C@H]1CC[C@@H]3[C@@H]2CC[C@]4([C@H]3CCC4=O)C)O[C@H]5[C@@H]([C@H]([C@@H]([C@H](O5)C(=O)O)O)O)O

Properties
Chemical formula	C_{25}H_{38}O_{8}
Molar mass	466.571 g/mol
- Except where otherwise noted, data are given for materials in their standard state (at 25 °C [77 °F], 100 kPa). Infobox references

Etiocholanolone glucuronide (ETIO-G) is an endogenous, naturally occurring metabolite of testosterone. It is formed in the liver from etiocholanolone by UDP-glucuronyltransferases. ETIO-G has much higher water solubility than etiocholanolone and is eventually excreted in the urine via the kidneys. Along with androsterone glucuronide, it is one of the major inactive metabolites of testosterone.

== Formation ==
A glucuronosyltransferase anzyme converts etiocholanolone to its glucuronide by adding a sugar acid to its hydroxy group, with uridine diphosphate (UDP) as byproduct:

etiocholanolone
+ UDP-glucuronate
UDP
etiocholanolone glucuronide

== See also ==
- 3α,5β-Androstanediol
- 5β-Dihydrotestosterone
- Androstanediol glucuronide
