= Androstanediol glucuronide =

Names
- IUPAC name 17β-Hydroxy-5α-androstan-3α-yl β-D-glucopyranosiduronic acid
- Systematic IUPAC name (2S,3S,4S,5R,6R)-3,4,5-Trihydroxy-6-{[(1S,3aS,3bR,5aS,7R,9aS,9bS,11aS)-1-hydroxy-9a,11a-dimethylhexadecahydro-1H-cyclopenta[a]phenanthren-7-yl]oxy}oxane-2-carboxylic acid

Identifiers
CAS Number	65535-18-4
3D model (JSmol)	Interactive image
ChemSpider	20558912
PubChem CID	16727166
UNII	UN7QBZ76AB
CompTox Dashboard (EPA)	DTXSID701335922
- InChI: InChI=1S/C25H40O8/c1-24-9-7-13(32-23-20(29)18(27)19(28)21(33-23)22(30)31)11-12(24)3-4-14-15-5-6-17(26)25(15,2)10-8-16(14)24/h12-21,23,26-29H,3-11H2,1-2H3,(H,30,31)/t12-,13+,14-,15-,16-,17-,18-,19-,20+,21-,23+,24-,25-/m0/s1 Key: GYNWSIBKBBWJJW-WWLGJQRMSA-N; InChI=1/C25H40O8/c1-24-9-7-13(32-23-20(29)18(27)19(28)21(33-23)22(30)31)11-12(24)3-4-14-15-5-6-17(26)25(15,2)10-8-16(14)24/h12-21,23,26-29H,3-11H2,1-2H3,(H,30,31)/t12-,13+,14-,15-,16-,17-,18-,19-,20+,21-,23+,24-,25-/m0/s1 Key: GYNWSIBKBBWJJW-WWLGJQRMBJ
- SMILES: C[C@]12CC[C@H](C[C@@H]1CC[C@@H]3[C@@H]2CC[C@]4([C@H]3CC[C@@H]4O)C)O[C@H]5[C@@H]([C@H]([C@@H]([C@H](O5)C(=O)O)O)O)O

Properties
Chemical formula	C_{25}H_{40}O_{8}
Molar mass	468.587 g·mol^{−1}
- Except where otherwise noted, data are given for materials in their standard state (at 25 °C [77 °F], 100 kPa). Infobox references

3α-Androstanediol glucuronide (3α-ADG) is a metabolite formed from human androgens; compounds involved in the development and maintenance of sexual characteristics. It is formed by the glucuronidation of 3α-androstanediol, which is the product of reduction of the sex hormone, dihydrotestosterone, and has been proposed as means of measuring androgenic activity.

3α-Androstanediol
+ UDP-glucuronate
UDP
Androstanediol glucuronide

== Formation ==
3α-androstanediol glucuronide is produced by the action of glucuronidase enzymes on 3α-androstanediol, itself a metabolite of dihydrotestosterone:

Dihydrotestosterone
3α-Androstanediol
3α-ADG

In women, the adrenal steroids, dehydroepiandrosterone sulfate, androstenedione and dehydroepiandrosterone are the major precursors of plasma 3α-ADG, accounting for almost the totality of circulating 3α-ADG. Levels of 3α-ADG decrease significantly with age.

3α-ADG is used as a marker of target tissue cellular action. 3α-ADG correlates with level of 5α-reductase activity (testosterone and 3α-androstanediol to dihydrotestosterone) in the skin. Concentrations of 3α-ADG are associated with the level of cutaneous androgen metabolism.

== See also ==
- 3β-Androstanediol
- Androsterone glucuronide
- Etiocholanolone glucuronide
