= Androsterone glucuronide =

Names
- IUPAC name 17-Oxo-5α-androstan-3α-yl β-D-glucopyranosiduronic acid
- Systematic IUPAC name (2S,3S,4S,5R,6R)-6-{[(3aS,3bR,5aS,7R,9aS,9bS,11aS)-9a,11a-Dimethyl-1-oxohexadecahydro-1H-cyclopenta[a]pheananthren-7-yl]oxy}-3,4,5-trihydroxyoxane-2-carboxylic acid
- Other names ADT-G; 5α-Androstan-3α-ol-17-one 3-glucuronide

Identifiers
CAS Number	1852-43-3
3D model (JSmol)	Interactive image
ChEBI	CHEBI:28832
ChemSpider	102793
KEGG	C11135
PubChem CID	114833
UNII	IMD4XD0W3U
CompTox Dashboard (EPA)	DTXSID80862764
- InChI: InChI=1S/C25H38O8/c1-24-9-7-13(32-23-20(29)18(27)19(28)21(33-23)22(30)31)11-12(24)3-4-14-15-5-6-17(26)25(15,2)10-8-16(14)24/h12-16,18-21,23,27-29H,3-11H2,1-2H3,(H,30,31)/t12-,13+,14-,15-,16-,18-,19-,20+,21-,23+,24-,25-/m0/s1 Key: VFUIRAVTUVCQTF-BSOWLZGZSA-N
- SMILES: C[C@]12CC[C@H](C[C@@H]1CC[C@@H]3[C@@H]2CC[C@]4([C@H]3CCC4=O)C)O[C@H]5[C@@H]([C@H]([C@@H]([C@H](O5)C(=O)O)O)O)O

Properties
Chemical formula	C_{25}H_{38}O_{8}
Molar mass	466.571 g/mol
- Except where otherwise noted, data are given for materials in their standard state (at 25 °C [77 °F], 100 kPa). Infobox references

Androsterone glucuronide (ADT-G) is a major circulating and urinary metabolite of testosterone and dihydrotestosterone (DHT). It accounts for 93% of total androgen glucuronides in women. ADT-G is formed from androsterone by UDP-glucuronosyltransferases, with the major enzymes being UGT2B15 and UGT2B17. It is a marker of acne in women while androstanediol glucuronide is a marker of hirsutism (excess hair growth) in women.

androsterone
+ UDP-glucuronate
UDP
androsterone glucuronide

== Relevance in women's health ==
Quantification of ADT-G and 3α-diol-G levels in Serum (blood) is an effective means of assessing androgen content in blood and androgenic activity in women. Androsterone glucuronide content can be estimated using Liquid chromatography–mass spectrometry. If an unusual level of ADT-G is observed in the blood (either an elevated or decreased amount), proper treatment plans can be developed in order to treat related symptoms.

Elevated levels of androsterone glucuronide in the blood have been observed in adult females who present with inflammatory acne. The introduction of therapeutic antiandrogen treatment and the use of an oral Contraceptive by women who are affected with androsterone related acne can decrease the amount of inflammatory acne present.

== See also ==
- 3α-Androstanediol
- Androsterone sulfate
- Etiocholanolone glucuronide
