= Body odour and sexual attraction =

Odour is the sensory stimulation of the olfactory membrane of the nose by a group of molecules. Certain body odours are connected to human sexual attraction. Humans can make use of body odour subconsciously to identify whether a potential mate will pass on favourable traits to their offspring. Body odour may provide significant cues about the genetic quality, health and reproductive success of a potential mate.

Body odour affects sexual attraction in several ways, including through human biology, the menstrual cycle and fluctuating asymmetry. The olfactory membrane plays a role in smelling and subconsciously assessing another human's pheromones. It affects the sexual attraction of insects and mammals. The major histocompatibility complex genes are important for the immune system, and appear to play a role in sexual attraction via body odour. Studies have shown that body odour is strongly connected with attraction in heterosexual females. The women in one study ranked body odour as more important for attraction than "looks". Humans may not simply depend on visual and verbal senses to be attracted to a possible partner/mate.

== Olfactory epithelium ==
The olfactory epithelium is a thick yellow/brown structure, about 6.5 cm^{2} (~1 in^{2}), located in the upper nasal cavity of the human nose. Made up of olfactory receptors and glands, the epithelium is used as a tool to smell others' body odour and pheromones. Chemicals that produce odour pass through the olfactory epithelium to the olfactory bulbs, which contain biological receptors that detect the chemicals, and respond with an electrical signal transmitted to the brain by the olfactory nerves. The olfactory epithelium plays a large role in why humans are attracted to persons biologically rather than physically; this relates directly to the sense of smell and not physical appearance. Olfactory communication is common in all animals, and recent studies have shown that humans have this communication trait as well. This kind of communication happens subconsciously, and often influences a person's attraction to another.

== Pheromones ==
Pheromones are chemical messengers produced and emitted by the body that contribute significantly to interpersonal attraction. The two types of pheromones include signal and primer, each playing a distinct role in human behaviour. Signal pheromones act as attractants and repellents; they are classified as short-term behavioural pheromones. Primer pheromones produce long-term changes in human behaviour and hormone production. The vomeronasal organ is used to detect the pheromones of others. Pheromones emitted from sweat glands play a role in sexual attraction, sexual repulsion, mother–infant bonding, and menstrual cycles.

=== Human sex pheromones ===
No study has conclusively isolated or identified human sex pheromones, although various researchers have investigated the possibility of their existence.

Pheromones, in general, are chemical substances secreted by organisms that trigger a social reaction in the same species. Sex pheromones are a special type of olfactory signal produced to attract the opposite sex and promote mating or other behaviors closely related to sexual reproduction. While humans are highly dependent upon visual cues, smells can also play a role in sociosexual behaviors. An inherent difficulty in studying human pheromones is the need for maintaining cleanliness and controlling natural body odors among participants.

Experiments have focused on three classes of putative human sex pheromones: axillary steroids, vaginal aliphatic acids, and stimulators of the vomeronasal organ.

Axillary steroids are produced by the testicles, ovaries, apocrine glands and adrenal glands. These chemicals are not biologically active until puberty when sex steroids influence their activity. The activity change during puberty suggests that humans communicate through odors. Several axillary steroids have been described as possible human pheromones: androstadienol, androstadienone, androstenone, androstenol, and androsterone.

== Biology ==
There is a relationship between various aspects of human biology and genetics with sexual attraction. This includes the role of the major histocompatibility complex (MHC), the human leukocyte antigen (HLA) and their different heterozygotic variations. Such genetic factors may play a role in sexual selection. Signalling odours in reproduction are called attractants; their function is to bring about successful mating.

The MHC (major histocompatibility complex) is a group of genes essential for the immune system, playing an important role in immunological recognition. These olfactory cues are involved in mate choice and preferences. HLA refers to the human form of MHC, and is a gene complex which encodes the MHC.

=== MHC ===
There is a correlation between mate choice, odour preference and genetic similarity at the MHC. Unique body smells are heavily influenced by MHC; these olfactory cues are probably involved in mate choice and preferences.

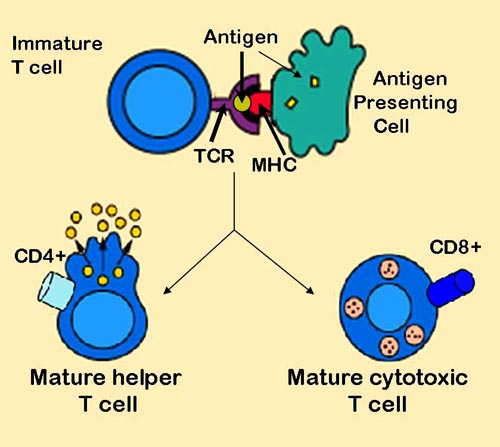
The Major Complex (MHC) shown presenting peptides to the immunological defence cells

MHC is expressed codominantly; a more diverse set of MHC genes leads to a stronger immune system. Women prefer male partners with differing MHC genes from themselves. An evolutionary explanation is that females are attracted to males with MHC alleles different from their own, to provide their offspring with a stronger immune system.

Females not using hormonal contraceptives were more attracted to the scent of males with dissimilar MHCs. Females currently using hormonal contraceptives preferred the scent of men with MHCs similar to their own. The scent of an individual with low fluctuating asymmetry is universally more attractive.

The increased attraction between people of dissimilar MHCs may help to prevent incest and subsequent birth defects. This inbreeding avoidance hypothesis proposes that biases towards heterozygotic alleles prevent harmful genetic consequences which can arise from mating with genetic family members. Olfactory cues can be used to recognise kin.

Couples who have many failed attempts at conception may share a considerably larger number of genes than those who can conceive without problems. If, for these genetically similar couples, there is a successful conception, the babies are often born early or underweight.

A third hypothesis explaining the function of dissimilar MHC mate preferences, the parasite hypothesis, suggests that MHC heterozygotes may be resistant to rapidly evolving parasites.

=== HLA ===
The human leukocyte antigen system is a protein complex which is encoded by MHC in humans. Over thirty olfactory receptor genes have been located at the HLA class I region, which presents peptides from inside the cell to be destroyed by the immune system. HLA- linked olfactory receptor genes can therefore provide a possible mechanism for detecting HLA- specific odours.

Androstenol, found in fresh male sweat, is attractive to women.

Men and women are attracted to the pheromones they produce, and HLA is related to the perceptions of other people's odours. Men produce androstenol and androstenone. Androstenol is produced by fresh male sweat and is most attractive to women, while androstenone is produced once the sweat is exposed to oxygen and is highly unpleasant to women.

Studies have shown that women who are at the most fertile stage of their menstrual cycle prefer the smell of men who have higher testosterone levels. Heterozygosity of HLA can also be detected through scent: in this case, heterozygosity confers greater ability to recognise a wider variety of antigens. Women, especially when not using hormonal contraceptives, are more attracted to the scent of men heterozygous for HLA.

Androstenone, from stale male sweat, is unattractive.

However, the same attraction and mate preferences are not held by men for heterozygous women. Men are, however, more attracted to the scent of women with rare HLA alleles. Men's arousal can be influenced by a variety of odours. For example, pumpkin pie, liquorice, doughnuts, and lavender can increase penile blood flow, consequently causing arousal.

=== Human pheromones and facial attraction ===
Two types of male pheromones: 5α-androst-16-en-3-one (MP1, androstenone) and 4,16-androstadien-3-one (MP2, androstadienone) and one type of female pheromone: 1,3,5(10),16-estratetrael-3-ol (FP, estratetraenol) are used as signals of mating quality. Studies showed that MP2 has the strongest response produced by female vomeronasal organ (VNO), which is the first stage of the olfactory system. Sex-difference processing in the hypothalamus has been found between female and male pheromones, including in the VNO, where opposite-sex pheromones have different surface potential.

Studies have illustrated a relationship between human facial attraction and pheromones. Individuals rated those of the opposite sex as more attractive if they preferred the individual's pheromones' odour. It was also demonstrated that partners in a long-term relationship would have higher concordance between two types of signals of mating quality, vision and olfaction. In addition, no difference was found between the two types of male pheromones in women's preference aside from the location of pheromone production.

== Body odour and menstrual cycle changes ==
Women's fertility levels shift dramatically throughout the menstrual cycle, so the period surrounding ovulation is extremely important because it represents the peak period of reproductive fertility. As conception is most likely to occur during a woman's brief fertile period, evolutionary theories suggest that men possess adaptations designed to maximise their reproductive success during this period. Women's fertility shapes male mating behaviour, many studies have shown that being exposed to the scent of women's fertility led men to display greater implicit accessibility to mating-related concepts, males also judged the odours of women during the follicular phase as more pleasant and 'sexy' than odours during the luteal (non-ovulatory) phase. Olfaction, therefore, transmits information relevant to human mate selection, through which men are capable of detecting shifts in women's fertility.

There is now also considerable evidence from psychological studies that women's preferences for various male traits change throughout the menstrual cycle. Hormonal fluctuation across the menstrual cycle explains temporal variation in women's judgment of the attractiveness of members of the opposite sex. This is due to the psychological processes that shape the formation and maintenance of human romantic relationships, which are influenced by variation in hormonal levels.

The menstrual cycle highlighting the most fertile period, and the follicular and luteal phase

Due to their high hormone content, oral contraceptives have the potential to alter women's partner preference for a range of male traits, which could have important consequences on sexual relationships, as it alters women's attraction to their partner and, potentially, to other men. If a woman's use of oral contraceptives is congruent, meaning she was using oral contraceptives when she met her partner, her current preference will more closely match the preference that shaped her partner choice in the first place, and the desire is higher than that of a woman whose use of oral contraceptives is incongruent. The resulting factor is that women's partner preferences are influenced by oral contraceptives use, meaning that attraction towards an existing partner changes over time if a woman initiates or discontinues oral contraceptive use.

Studies have shown that men are more attracted to women when they are more fertile and/or on their menstrual cycle. Women gave samples of when they were fertile and less fertile. The men in the study would smell and choose which of the two samples they were more attracted to. Women give off a more favourable smell the more fertile they are; in other words, men notice this and choose the more fertile sample rather than the less fertile sample.

=== Body odour as a cue for ovulation ===
It has been hypothesised that changes in body odour during the menstrual cycle may provide cues to males about the fertility of females. However, evidence for the ability of males to detect these signals is poor. One study found that the odour of shirts worn by females in the follicular phase was considered more pleasant by males than the odour of the same females during luteal phase. Meanwhile, a similar study of a slightly larger sample size failed to find a significant difference between males' ratings of ovulating and non-ovulating females' odours. Another study found a significant difference in males' salivary testosterone levels after smelling the shirts of ovulating versus non-ovulating females.

== Body odor and fluctuating asymmetry ==
Fluctuating asymmetry (FA) is a type of biological asymmetry, referring to the extent to which small random deviations occur from expected perfect symmetry in different populations of organisms. In humans, for example, FA can be demonstrated through the unequal sizes of bilateral features such as the eyes, ears and breasts. FA acts as an index for measuring developmental instability as it provides a clear indicator of the possible environmental and genetic stressors affecting development. It is thought that having a preference for a symmetrical face offers some adaptive value as such symmetry may signal an individual's ability to cope with environmental challenges. FA shares an inverse relationship with certain desired traits; a low FA is correlated with higher stress tolerance, larger body size in males, smaller body size in females, and higher facial attractiveness. FA is detectable through the olfactory senses, and it has a measurable effect on sexual attraction. Significant cues may be found through body odour relating to a potential mate's health, reproductive status and genetic quality, and FA is one such cue as it is considered to be a marker of genetic and developmental stability.

During their fertile phase, females have repeatedly been shown as being more attracted to the body odours of more symmetrical males and of males whose faces they rate as attractive. The scent of symmetrical males provides an honest indicator of the male's phenotypic and genetic quality. This may explain why highly fertile women find the scent of low FA as attractive and yet this scent is not necessarily as attractive to other women. For example, it has been found that normally cycling women near their peak fertility tended to prefer the odour of shirts worn by symmetrical men and yet women at low fertility in their menstrual cycle or those using contraceptive pills showed no preference for the odour of shirts of symmetrical men compared to those of asymmetrical men. These findings support the good genes hypothesis, such that when women are in the fertile phase of their menstrual cycle, they should prefer markers of genetic benefits or 'good genes'. In other words, fertile women who prefer the scent of men with low FA are demonstrating a preference for the genetic benefits associated with those symmetric men.

It is widely accepted that men prefer the scent of women in their most fertile period. For example, in one study, men rated the body odours of T-shirts worn by women during their most fertile phase as more sexy and pleasant than T-shirts worn during their least fertile phase. Despite this, much of the research in the area concludes that the effect of the scent of symmetry appears to be sex specific such that men do not find the scent of symmetrical women more attractive than the scent of asymmetrical women. It therefore appears that attraction to symmetric body odour of the opposite sex appears to apply exclusively to women, and specifically fertile women, as non-fertile women and men do not display this preference.

== Body odour in selection ==
=== Sex differences ===
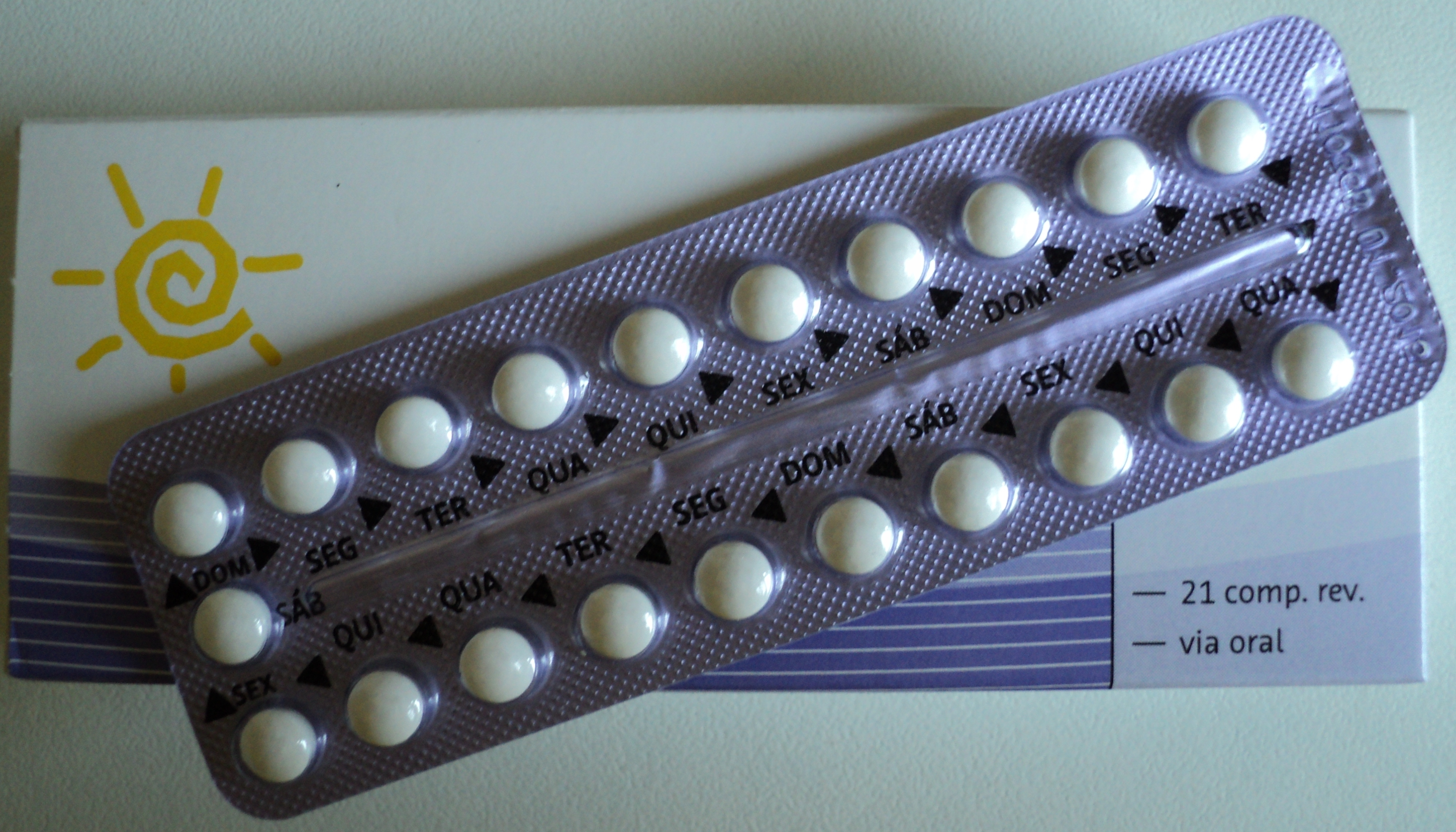
Oral hormone contraceptive pills

Whilst a vast number of studies have been conducted to investigate body odour and mating, research is now shifting in particular towards the effect of male scent on female sexual attraction. This is largely due to the effects of the menstrual cycle and hormone contraceptives, which directly affect women's partner preference.

Past research has highlighted the importance of a male's scent to females, such that smell was rated significantly more important for women than men. Furthermore, smell and body odour were rated as the most important physical factors for females, compared to looks for males. Further studies have aimed to understand these sex differences. Using questionnaires and self-report data, a greater reliance was found for females on olfactory cues than for males. This reliance was valued for females in both sexual and non-sexual contexts. The research strongly supports the hypothesis that whilst men use more physical and visual cues, women rely more heavily on olfactory cues such as body odour that men tend to overlook.

=== Body odor enhancement ===
It has been established that women tend to rely more heavily on olfactory cues than men, rating those with pleasant body odour as more attractive than those with less pleasant body odour. Moreover, body odour and sexual attraction can be enhanced using artificial fragrances and dietary habits. Whilst males are influenced by body odour during selection, past research has demonstrated a significantly greater reliance on such cues by females.

Aside from artificial fragrances, researchers have also begun to focus on more natural odour enhancements such as diet quality. A recent study aimed to investigate whether a dietary fruit and vegetable intake would influence female mate preferences. Its results showed that subjects rated as most pleasant smelling were those with a higher fruit and vegetable intake, suggesting male body odour can be enhanced by diet to appeal to females.

Both sexes commonly use artificial scents to enhance their perceived sexual appeal. Many of these (musk compounds) share a similar chemical profile with naturally produced body chemicals. Research has found a significant correlation between an individual's MHC genotype and the ratings they assigned to certain perfumes labelled to use "for self". This therefore supports the hypothesis that perfumes can personally enhance body odours that indicate an individual's immunogenetics.

== In animals ==
=== Insects ===
Insects use extremely sensitive receptors to detect pheromone signals. Each pheromone signal can elicit a distinct response based on the gender and social status of the recipient. In insects, sex pheromones can be detected in very minute concentrations in the environment. Insect sex pheromones, usually released by the female to lure a male, are vital in the process by which insects locate each other for mating. The main purpose of releasing these sex pheromones is to attract a partner from a distance; the sex pheromones also serve to evoke a courtship response and sexually excite the male before copulation. Male insects can also release sex pheromones, but this is only for sexually exciting the female, making her more receptive to the male's advances. Generally, the majority of insects are sensitive and selective to the sex pheromone of their own species.

Insects make use of two classes of pheromone signals: the pheromones that induce immediate or releaser effects (for example, aggression or mating behaviours) and those that elicit long-lasting or 'primer' effects, such as physiological and hormonal changes.

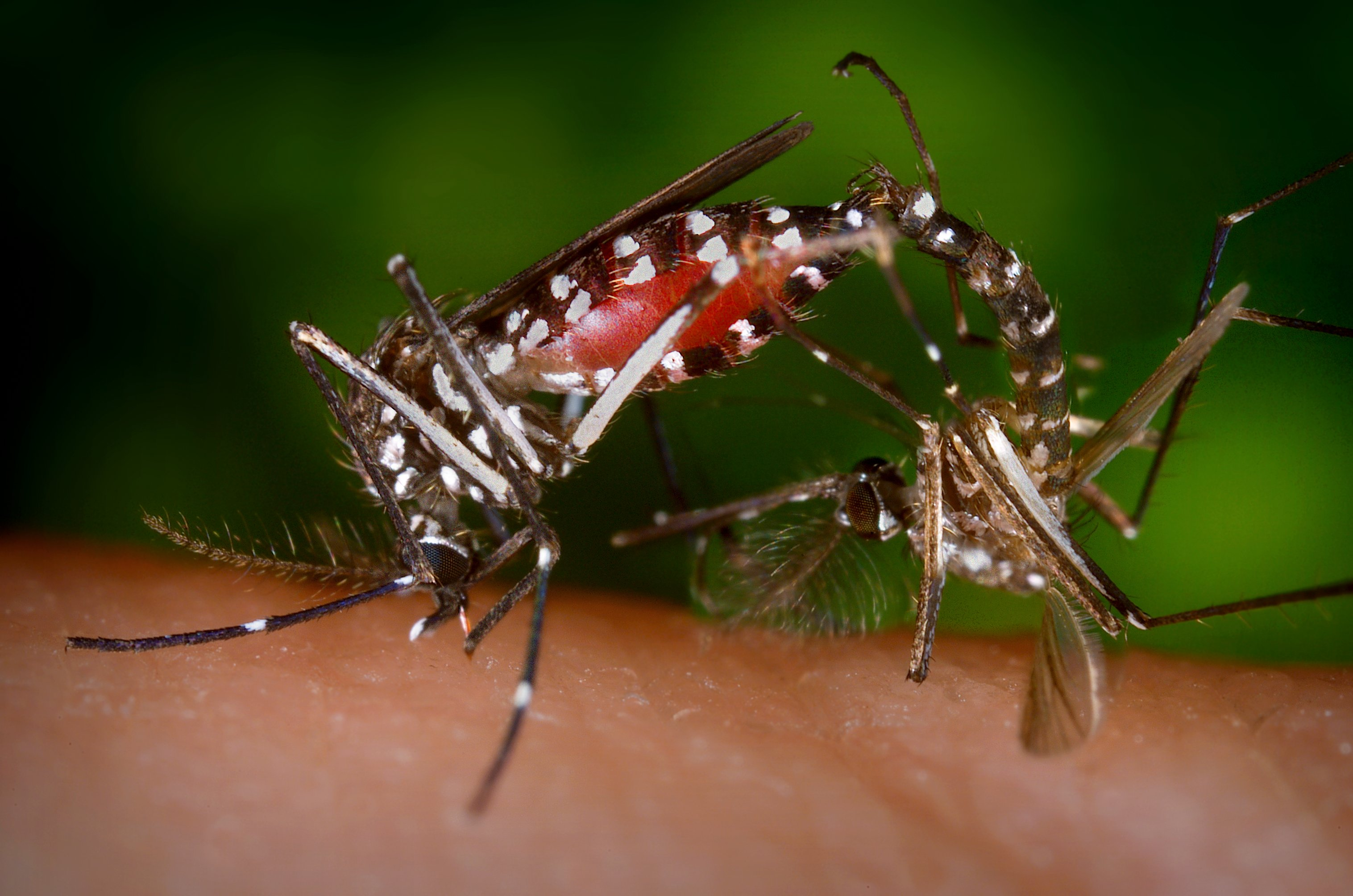
A pair of mosquitos during mating season

There is a significant amount of research supporting body odour and sexual attraction in insects. Observations and laboratory experiments identified a chemical substance involved in the mating behaviour of Culiseta inornata; when exposed to this scent the male mosquitoes were found to attempt sex with dead females and when exposed to the scent of virgin females, the males showed increased sexual activity through excited flight, searching and attempts to copulate with other males. Further evidence comes from research on the commercial silkworm moth, Bombyx mori. A chemical produced in the abdominal sac of the female adult moth is released shortly after it emerges from the cocoon; male moths were found to be immediately attracted to this scent, demonstrated by a characteristic wing flutter and attempts to copulate. The sex pheromones of the silkworm moths can elicit responses in the male antenna at concentrations of only a few hundred molecules per square centimetre.

=== Vertebrates ===
For vertebrates, aquatic environments are an ideal medium for dispersing chemical signals over large areas. Aquatic vertebrates use chemical signals for a wide range of purposes, from attracting mates to distant nesting sites during spawning, to signalling reproductive readiness and regulating predator/prey interactions. Research on goldfish has identified that the fish release hormones in various combinations, depending on the reproductive status of the releaser, and these different combinations can elicit varying degrees of male courtship in the recipient.

In terrestrial environments, chemosignals can be either volatile or non-volatile. Accordingly, terrestrial vertebrates have two functionally and anatomically distinct olfactory systems: the main olfactory system, which is receptive to volatile cues, and the vomeronasal system, which is thought to process mostly non-volatile pheromones.

==== Mammals ====
A bull elk attracts females by urinating on himself during the rut.

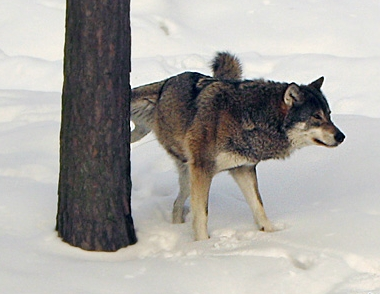
Female wolves are attracted to the urine and preputial gland secretions of males during the breeding season.

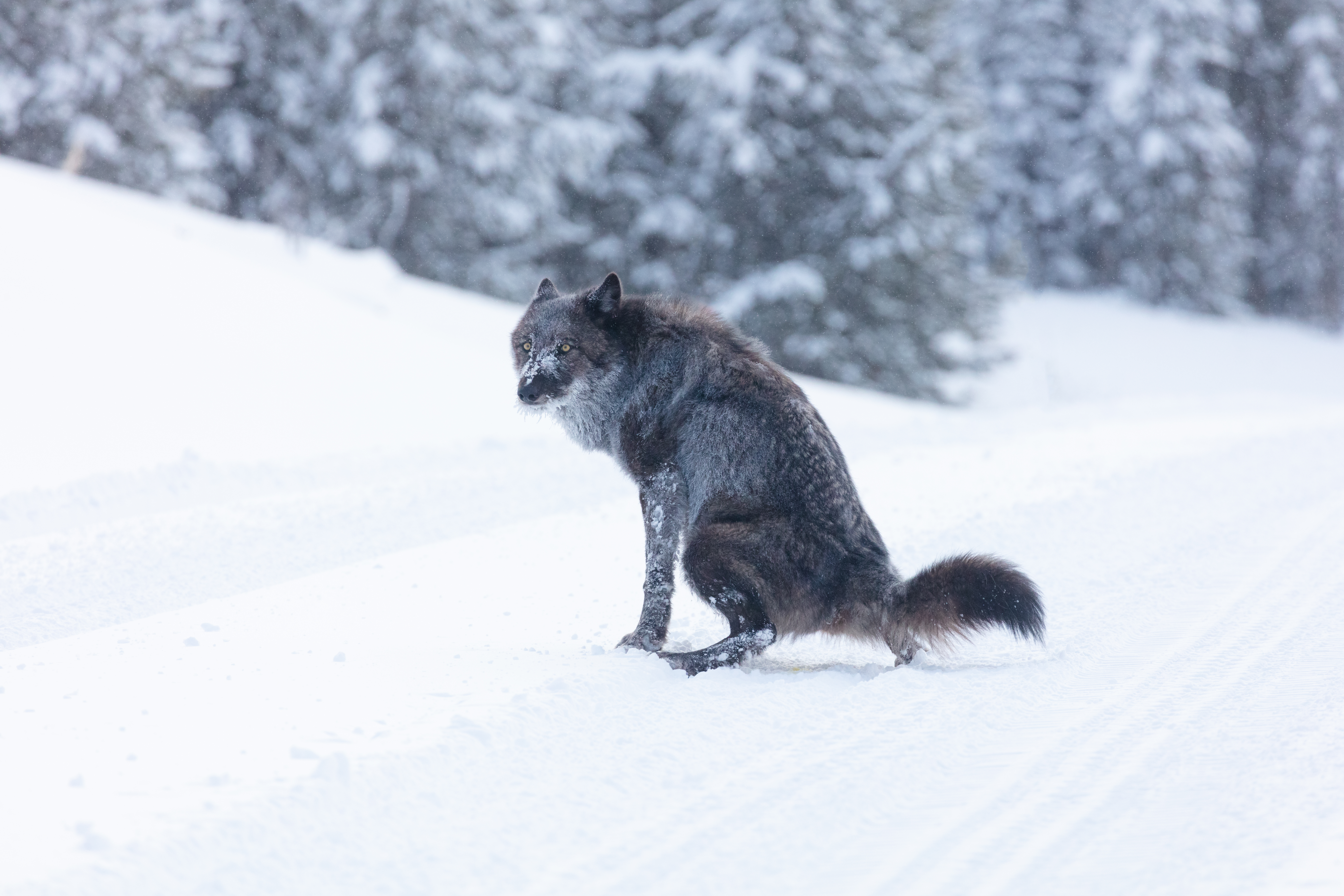
Male wolves are attracted to the urine of females in estrus.

When it comes to sex, mammals use chemical signals (pheromones) to convey information to one another. Mammalian pheromones are air-borne chemical substances released in the urine or faeces of animals or secreted from sweat glands that are perceived by the olfactory system and that elicit both behavioural and endocrine responses in conspecifics. Mammals use sex pheromones to arouse, attract, and elicit specific behavioural responses from the opposite sex. In mammals, chemical signals and the scent glands that secrete them have many features in common, for example, expression in only one sex, development only in adults, often only secreted in breeding season and used exclusively in mating. For an odour to stimulate sexual behaviour exclusively, it must not only be perceived and preferred, but when absent, there should be a decrease or complete elimination of sexual activity. This exclusivity has only been shown in golden hamsters and the rhesus monkey.

Mammalian pheromones can elicit both long-lasting effects that alter the hormone levels of the recipient animal, and short-term effects on its behaviour. For example, detection of male pheromones by female mice has been found to encourage onset of puberty, however the detection of female pheromones have been found to delay the onset of puberty.

Odour can influence mammalian mating both directly and indirectly. Odour may act as a direct benefit to females, for example, by avoiding contagious diseases by using odour cues to choose a healthy mate. Odour can also act as an indicator mechanism, a form of indirect benefit, for example when a male displays a particular trait such as strength of odour which is in proportion to their heritable viability, females choosing males with strong odours will gain genes for high viability to pass to their offspring.

There is vast evidence for the use of pheromones in mating behaviours. For example, when boars become sexually aroused, they salivate profusely, dispersing pheromones into the air. These pheromones attract receptive sows, causing them to adopt a specific mating posture, known as standing, which allows the male boar to mount them and therefore copulate.

=== Species specificity ===
Regardless of the species, sex pheromones are often structurally similar, and for that reason, different species need to be able to respond to the correct pheromone. It is the variation in the ratios of each compound within a pheromone that yields species specificity. The use of mixtures of compounds as pheromones is well documented in insects; research into male orchid bees demonstrates that specific odours mediate exclusive attraction within a species.

== See also ==
- Fluctuating asymmetry
- Major histocompatibility complex and sexual selection
- Pheromone § Humans
- Sexual attraction
- Sexual motivation and hormones
- Ovulatory shift hypothesis
- Socks
- Foot odor
- Body odor
- Foot fetishism
