= Human sex pheromones =

Physiological theory on human attraction

No study has conclusively isolated or identified human sex pheromones, although various researchers have investigated the possibility of their existence.

Pheromones, in general, are chemical substances secreted by organisms that trigger a social reaction in the same species. Sex pheromones are a special type of olfactory signal to promote mating or other behaviors closely related to sexual reproduction. While humans are highly dependent upon visual cues, smells can also play a role in sociosexual behaviors. An inherent difficulty in studying human pheromones is the need for maintaining cleanliness and controlling natural body odors among participants.

Experiments have focused on three classes of putative human sex pheromones: axillary steroids, vaginal aliphatic acids, and stimulators of the vomeronasal organ.

Axillary steroids are produced by the testicles, ovaries, apocrine glands and adrenal glands. These chemicals are not biologically active until puberty when sex steroids influence their activity. The activity change during puberty suggests that humans communicate through odors. Several axillary steroids have been described as possible human pheromones: androstadienol, androstadienone, androstenone, androstenol, and androsterone.

== Androstenol ==
Androstenol is the putative female pheromone. In a 1978 study by Kirk-Smith, people wearing surgical masks treated with androstenol or untreated were shown pictures of people, animals and buildings and asked to rate their attractiveness. Individuals with their masks treated with androstenol rated their photographs as being "warmer" and "more friendly".

== Debunked synchronizing of menstrual cycles ==
The best-known case study involves the (now challenged) synchronization of menstrual cycles among women based on unconscious odor cues, the McClintock effect, named after the primary investigator, Martha McClintock, of the University of Chicago. A group of women were exposed to a whiff of perspiration from other women. Depending on the time in the month the sweat was collected (before, during, or after ovulation), there was an association with the recipient woman's menstrual cycle to speed up or slow down. The 1971 study proposed two types of pheromones involved: "One, produced prior to ovulation, shortens the ovarian cycle; and the second, produced just at ovulation, lengthens the cycle". However, recent studies and reviews of the methodology have called the validity of her results into question. A 2013 meta-review of existing studies showed that the syncing of ovarian cycles likely did not exist.

== Androstenone ==
Androstenone is postulated to be secreted only by men as an attractant for women and is also thought to affect their mood positively. It seems to have different effects on women, depending on where a female is in her menstrual cycle, with the highest sensitivity to it during ovulation. In 1983, study participants exposed to androstenone were shown to undergo changes in skin conductance. Androstenone has been found to be perceived as more pleasant to women at a woman's time of ovulation. It is hypothesized that this may be a way for a male to detect an ovulating female who would be more willing to be involved in sexual interaction.

== See also ==
- List of neurosteroids § Pheromones and pherines
- Body odour and sexual attraction

== Bibliography ==
- Yuhas, Daisy (1 May 2014). "Are Human Pheromones Real?". Scientific American.
- Jacob, Tim J.C. (2005) [1999] A critical review of the evidence for the existence (1) human pheromones and (2) a functional vomeronasal organ (VNO) in humans, School of Biosciences, Cardiff University
