= Seduction =

Enticing a person to sexual behaviour

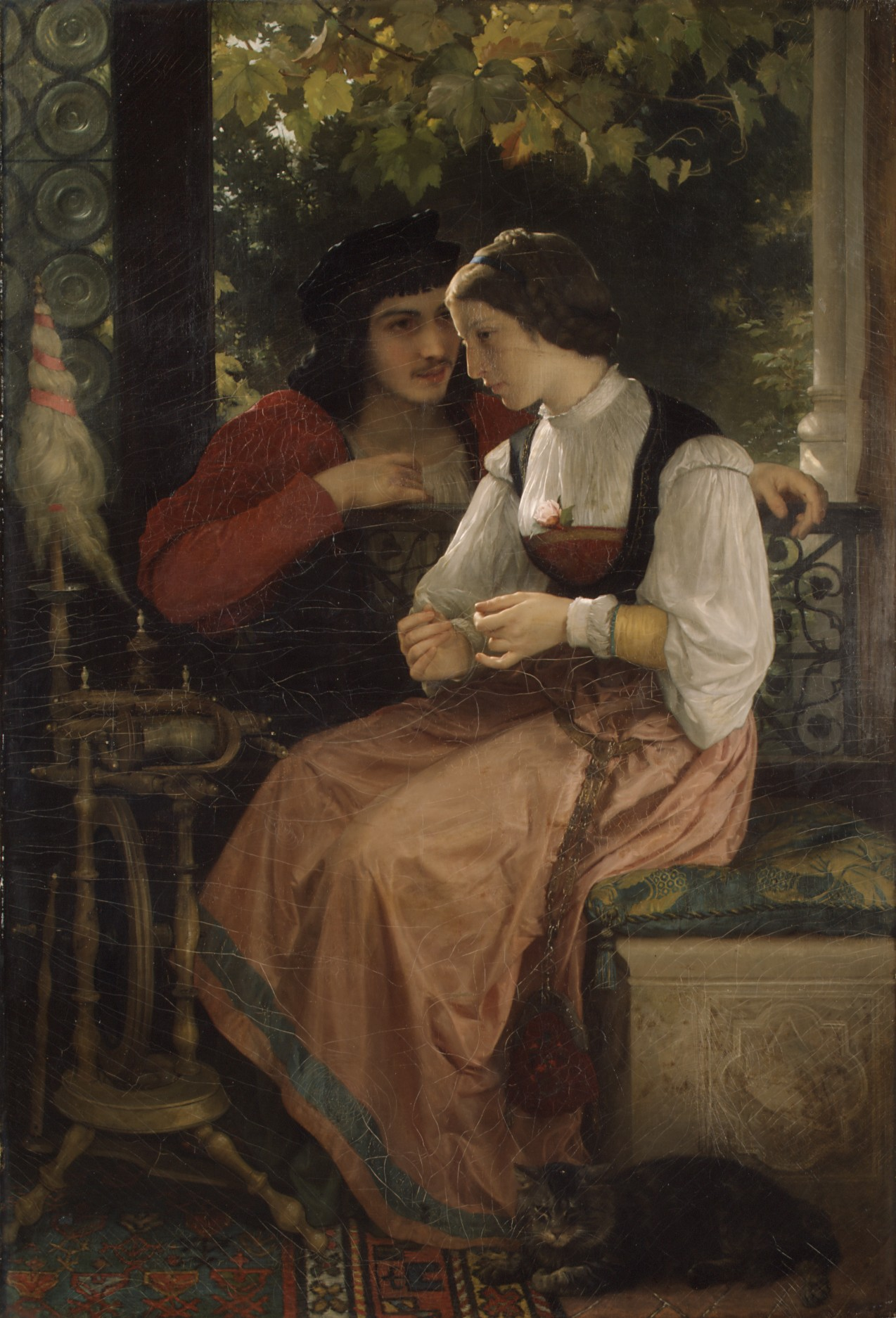
The Proposal (1872), William-Adolphe Bouguereau (1825–1905)

In sexuality, seduction means enticing someone else into sexual intercourse or other sexual activity. Strategies of seduction include conversation and sexual scripts, paralingual features, non-verbal communication, and short-term behavioural strategies.

The word seduction stems from Latin seducere, which means, literally, 'to lead astray' or 'to draw aside'. As a result, the term may have a negative connotation. Seen negatively, seduction involves temptation and enticement, often sexual in nature, to coerce someone into a behavioural choice they would not have made if they were not in a state of sexual arousal. Seen positively, seduction is synonymous for the act of charming someone—male or female—by an appeal to the senses, often with the goal of reducing unfounded fears and leading to "sexual emancipation". Some sides in contemporary academic debate state that the morality of seduction depends on the long-term impacts on the individuals concerned, rather than the act itself, and may not necessarily carry the negative connotations expressed in dictionary definitions.

Famous seducers from history or legend include Lilith, Giacomo Casanova, and the fictional character Don Juan. The emergence of the internet and technology has supported the availability and the existence of a seduction community, which is based on discourse about seduction. This is predominantly by "pickup artists" (PUA). Seduction is also used within marketing to increase compliance and willingness.

== History ==
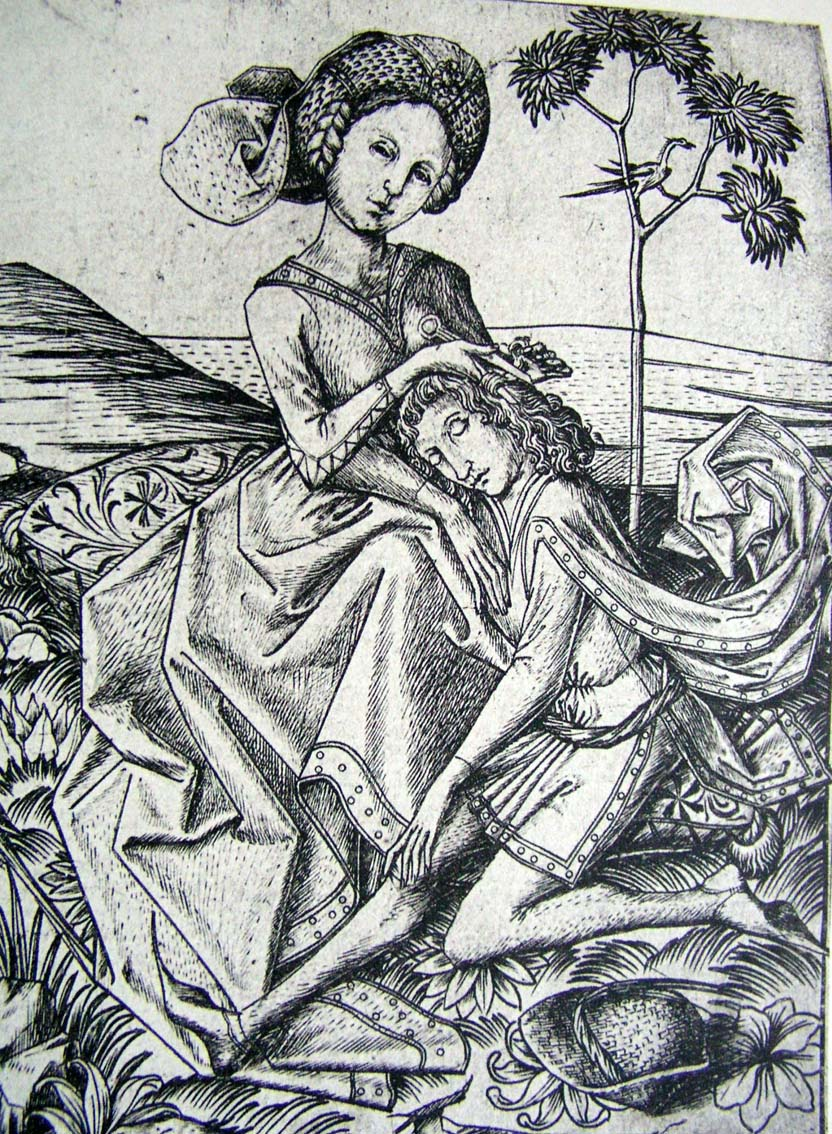
Delilah cutting Samson's hair, c. 1460

Seduction is a popular motif in history and fiction, both as a warning of the social consequences of engaging in the behaviour or becoming its victim, and as a salute to a powerful skill. In the Bible, Eve offers the forbidden fruit to Adam. Eve herself was verbally seduced by the serpent, believed in Christianity to be Satan; later, Chapter 7 of Proverbs warns of the pitfalls of seduction. Sirens of Greek mythology lured sailors to their death by singing them to shipwreck; Cleopatra beguiled both Julius Caesar and Marc Antony, Dionysus was the Greek god of seduction and wine. Famous male seducers, their names synonymous with sexual allure, range from Genji to John Wilmot, 2nd Earl of Rochester and James Bond.

In biblical times, because unmarried females who lost their virginity had also lost much of their value as marriage prospects, the Old Testament Book of Exodus specifies that the seducer must marry his victim or pay her father to compensate him for his loss of the marriage price: "And if a man entice a maid that is not betrothed, and lie with her, he shall surely endow her to be his wife. If her father utterly refuse to give her unto him, he shall pay money according to the dowry of virgins."

The Book of Judges in the Old Testament describes Delilah seducing Samson who was given great strength by God, but ultimately lost his strength when she allowed the Philistines to shave his hair off during his slumber.

== Use in sexual relationships ==
Males and females both implement the strategy of seduction as a method of negotiating their sexual relationships. This can often involve manipulation of other individuals. This is primarily based on desire, normally physical, as well as attraction towards them. Popular phrases often used include; 'the language of love is universal'. These phrases help to demonstrate the extensively pervasive and ubiquitous strategy use within love and relationships amongst humans. Individuals employing such strategies often do so subconsciously and will merely report the feelings and thoughts that they subjectively experienced and are colloquially comparable to 'attraction' or 'love'.

Research has indicated that seduction could substitute or equate to a form of collapsed or condensed courtship. Evolutionary psychology suggests that this form of sexual enticement can be used in order to cajole desired individuals to engage in sexual intercourse and ultimately reproduce. This behaviour is also aimed at persuading someone to develop a short-term or long-term sexual relationship with them. Males declare that they adopt the strategy of seduction statistically more frequently than females. From an evolutionary perspective, this has been linked with females' higher parental investment and the lack of guarantee of male parental investment, although evolutionary science cannot draw a causal relationship between the two factors. Females therefore need to be seduced more prior to engaging in sexual intercourse. Men more commonly wish to engage in more frequent short-term mating, which may require this strategy of seduction used to access the female for intercourse. However, this finding has been contradicted by non-verbal seduction results which indicate that females have more control within this area. Other potential strategies individuals employ to gain access to a mate include courting or having relatives select mates for socioeconomic reasons. Ultimately, both males and females have reported preferring seduction above all other strategies, such as the use of power or aggression, for making a potential partner agree to sexual intercourse.

== Human mate poaching ==
Seduction is related to human mate poaching. Human mate poaching is when either a male or female purposefully entices another individual who is already in an established relationship into sexual relations with them. This is akin to the definition of seduction in the introduction. This is a psychological mechanism which had unconscious and conscious manifestations, that in relation to evolutionary psychology has been adaptive to our ancestors in the past and has continued to be functional in modern society.

Human mate poaching is a form of seduction, and can be used as a short-term and long-term mating strategy among both sexes. Moreover, there are associated costs and benefits to poaching. Schmitt and Buss (2001) investigated the potential costs and benefits across sexes in relation to human mate poaching. Costs for engaging in poaching behaviours include unwanted pregnancy, transmitted infection and diseases, and insecurity about provisions (shelter, food, and financial security) and/or resource depletion, violence and aggression from the current partner, who takes part in human mate guarding behaviours (behaviours used to protect their mate from other potential males or females). However, the associated benefits include emotional support that may not be received from a current partner, and access to 'good genes', such as facial symmetry. The associated benefits also include increased sexual variety, access to physically attractive mates, and non-committal copulations.

Evolutionarily speaking, we are descended from our reproductively-successful ancestors who managed to solve the adaptive problem of finding a mate with the required characteristics needed at that time in their lives, e.g., plenty of resources, physical attractiveness, and showing signs of honest fertility. Therefore, our ancestors would have deployed this tactic (for enticing a suitable mate), which remains in our psychology. Some evolved poaching behaviours may not be suitable for current environmental problems. Leftover by-products from human evolution, such as preferences for fat and sugar, are not adaptive in western cultures at present, and thus similar poaching behaviours could still remain.

=== Short term ===
==== In males ====
Short-term strategies involved in seduction are associated with the dark triad, however predominantly in males. Short-term strategies are those used by an individual to obtain a mate for a short term sexual encounter.

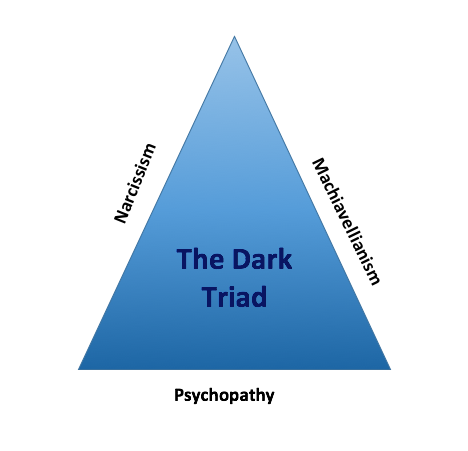
The Dark Triad, proposed by Paulhus and Williams (2002)

The dark triad is made up of three personality traits, psychopathy, narcissism and Machiavellianism and was proposed by Paulhus and Williams (2002). The three traits are exploitative in nature and are used for sexually coercive behaviours, useful in the seduction process. Typically these three traits are deemed maladaptive for the individual and society. Nevertheless, these traits have been found to be adaptive in an exploitative strategy in short term mating. Dark triad traits are adaptive for an unrestricted sociosexuality and promiscuous behaviours. The three traits are associated with impulsivity, manipulative behaviours and lack of empathy. These personality traits would be useful in seducing a partner for a short term encounter. From an evolutionary perspective, these would have been particularly beneficial to our ancestral males who wanted to increase their reproductive success, through seducing many women and therefore increasing their chance of passing on their genes. These particular traits may be used as a tactic for increasing success in mating.

The dark triad traits are seen more in males where the parental investment is lower. Having numerous copulations with many women increases the likelihood their genes will be passed on. Comparatively, a woman has to invest time and a lot of energy in carrying an infant and looking after him/her for many years subsequently.

==== In females ====
The triad of traits ancestrally would not have been adaptive for women, because females were and still are less likely or less willing to engage in casual sex, because of the lack of certainty of resources to provide for her and her offspring, as well as lower chances of orgasm.

Additionally, there are other potential considerations of the implication of short-term strategies. Males cannot employ such strategies without there being willing females to engage in sexual intercourse within a short-term relationship with them. Therefore, benefits from engaging in multiple short-term mating must also exist for females. These matings enable females to practice and enhance their skills, specifically within attraction and seduction. This often occurs during extra-pair mating when females have sexual intercourse with males other than their husband. There are potential benefits for females to engage in these matings, including the ability to acquire more resources. For example, females are better able to access meats, goods or services in exchange for sexual intercourse or if she were to give birth to a child whose father has better genes than her husband. Females use these short-term matings to hone their mating and seduction skills and increase their protection. This is because males often provide increased protection against other males exploitation or from non-humans for the females they mate with and their offspring. However, this willingness to make the first move towards seduction and engage in a sexual relationship may be subtle. For example, females may simply stand close to their target.

Improving attraction and seduction skills can also help a female with acquiring a better or more desirable male according to the 'Mate Switching Hypothesis'. This is because, females are able to assess their potential mate before committing to a long-term relationship. Alternatively, according to this hypothesis females are also able to get rid of an unwanted husband through mate expulsion using short-term strategies, such as by seducing another man into a short-term sexual relationship. Females may also be more equipped at deterring male partners from future infidelity, demonstrated by the 'Mate Manipulation Hypothesis'. This hypothesis suggests that females are able to use revenge to deter future infidelity. This can be achieved by a female partaking in a short-term affair, incorporating the use of seduction, with another male as a revenge tactic for her husband's previous affair, which aims to increase commitment of her intended long-term mate. These hypotheses indicate the benefits for females of developing and expanding on their seduction skills within sexual relationships.

=== Long term ===
'Strategies are defined as evolved solutions to adaptive problems'. Men and women differ in the adaptive problems that they face, and therefore deploy different strategies. Women strongly desire the resources and commitment that comes with paternal parental investment and therefore impose a longer period of time for courtship and use of seduction prior to engaging in a long-term sexual relationship. Women also spend time seeking and seducing men that are willing to invest and commit in the long run. It is likely that exploitative strategies will not be used when seducing a long-term partner. The traits associated within the dark triad (Machiavellianism, psychopathy and narcissism) are not useful for long term mating strategies because they are negatively correlated with agreeableness, empathy and reciprocation, which are traits promoting a healthy relationship.

== Biosocial theory ==
Kenrick and Trost (1987) have formulated a Biosocial theory of heterosexual relationships which encompasses several stages of seduction. This includes five stages of natural progression:

1. Individuals identify a potential partner based on desired characteristics such as physical attraction
2. Both individuals establish contact
3. Other traits of the individual that are not necessarily explicit are analysed to determine fitness
4. A physical relationship is established
5. The relationship is either successful and progresses or discontinued

Within these stages, both individuals are interacting in a game which is never explicit, this is because if either individual were to be rejected this would damage their self-esteem. Therefore, when seducing, the overarching aims and goals are never vocalised to the other desired individual. This is sometimes referred to as paradoxical exhibition.

The main goal of seduction whether it is active under conscious or unconscious mechanisms is to impress the desired partner and display positive characteristics that are likely to be attractive, and to repress undesirable characteristics.

=== Non-verbal communication ===
Within the interactive seduction game, non-verbal communication is a prominent feature in accessing the desirable potential mate. The purpose of this communication is to reduce the interpersonal distance between the desired individuals.

Physiological features such as pupil dilation are a salient cue, expressing attraction. Leading on from this, eye contact is a very notable sign of attraction. Although there are cross cultural differences in whether eye contact is used or not, in Western cultures, the duration of eye contact and the exchange between two individuals is important in the first stages of the biosocial model. Another non-verbal cue in the process of seduction are facial expressions. Smiling is considered another prominent feature in seduction, as it signifies willingness to engage in a social interaction, and in the case of seduction, to participate in creating an intimate bond. These non-verbal behaviours become synchronised between the two individuals which can then lead to the last two stages of the biosocial model.

=== Paralingual features ===
Paralingual features are those associated with the voice, such as pitch, tone and rhythm. These features of verbal communication change in different stages of the seduction process. Studies have shown that when initiating an interaction with a female, the seductive characteristics of the voice will begin with slightly higher pitch and increased articulation in the first meeting. However, whilst seducing, the paralanguage will alter gradually. His voice will eventually become softer with lower pitch and modulated voice. These characteristics of the voice are akin to those adults use when speaking to children, in infant directed speech. This is vocal exhibition, which has been found mostly in males. The aim of modulating the voice is to attract the desired female and become intimate.

== Contemporary law ==
English common law defined the crime of seduction as a felony committed "when a male person induced an unmarried female of previously chaste character to engage in an act of sexual intercourse on a promise of marriage." A father had the right to maintain an action for the seduction of his daughter (or the enticement of a son who left home), since this deprived him of services or earnings.

In more modern times, Frank Sinatra was charged in New Jersey in 1938 with seduction, having enticed a woman "of good repute to engage in sexual intercourse with him upon his promise of marriage. The charges were dropped when it was discovered that the woman was already married."

Seduction is also associated with organized crime, particularly with the Italian-American Mafia, Russian mafia, Polish mob, and to a lesser extent, the Irish mob and Jewish mob. They often use attractive women from their gang in order to bribe, get money from, or damage the careers of male politicians, police officers, or government agents, as well as members of the general public.

== See also ==
- Body odour and sexual attraction
- Charisma
- Eros (love)
- Dating § Initiation
- Femme fatale
- Flirting
- Foreplay
- Freud's seduction theory
- Homosexual seduction
- Honey trapping
- Human sex pheromones
- Incubus and Succubus
- Proxemics
- The Art of Seduction
- Rake (character)
- Romantic love
- Sexual selection in humans
- Sperm competition
