= 16-Androstene =

Class of chemical compounds

Androstenol, a 16-androstene pheromone.

16-Androstenes, or androst-16-enes, are a class of endogenous androstane steroids that includes androstadienol, androstadienone, androstenone, and androstenol, which are pheromones. Some of the 16-androstenes, such as androstenone and androstenol, are odorous, and have been confirmed to contribute to human malodor.

== Background ==
The 16-Androstene steroid is most commonly found and produced in boar testicle, specifically in un-castrated male pigs, which results in a foul odor. This foul odor typically has a urine-like or skatole odor which is as a result of high concentration and levels of the 16-Androstene steroid found in the boar's Adipose tissue, that is observed when the boar fat is cooked on heat. The 16-Androstene acts as a pheromone which is transported in a boar's body through the bloodstream to the salivary glands and is metabolized in the liver which produces alpha and beta-androstenol. The reason why the 16-Androstene steroid is essential in the overall population of boars is because it plays a vital role in the mating process, specifically attracting gilts. The 16-Androstene steroid is a vital steroid to study in order to better understand varying genes and metabolic pathways and its relation to the similarities and differences observed in human axillary odors.

== Research Findings ==
The 16-Androstene steroid is a compound of interest in various research relating to the topic of steroid-based malodour. Most of the research conducted on the 16-Androstene steroid is done by experimentation of boars, often looking at various metabolic pathways and genetics which are similar and different in varying breeds of boars. These studies are conducted in order to utilize the research conducted on boars to better understand human axillary odors. Research conducted by Gower in 1994 suggested that the 16-Androstene along with other steroids such as the 5α-androstenol and 5α-androstenone, are prevalent in apocrine sweat glands. Later research by Austin and Ellis in 2003 revealed through the use of mass spectrometry (MS) and gas chromatography (GC), that the 16-Androstene steroid was present on axillary skin which determined that axillary bacteria are able to create 16-androstenes steroids from the bacteria that had the C16 double bond already present. Other research indicates that 3[beta]-hydroxysteroid dehydrogenase (3[beta]-HSD) plays a vital role in the metabolism of androstenone. When looking at the adipose tissue of a boar, it was also observed that there were high levels of androstenone when there was a low expression of enzymes, protein and mRNA showing a negative trend. Additionally, some research indicates that the presence of the 16-Androstene steroid contributes significantly to the role and function of the liver which is to participate in phase II conjugation metabolism. These were some of the research findings from various articles illustrating the role that the 16-Androstene steroid plays in metabolic pathways and genetics. All of these research findings are able to assist in better understanding genes, metabolic pathways, and enzymes which will aid in scientists understanding how to diminish boar taint / odor.

== Research Methods ==
A variety of research methods were utilized in multiple research articles to gather vital information on the 16-Androstene steroid. Methods such as PCR, mass spectrometry (MS), gas chromatography (GC), solid-phase chromatography, microarray technology, and various other methods were utilized in the research articles to understand the 16-Androstene steroid.

== See also ==
- Androstane
- Androsterone
- Estratetraenol
