= OR7D4 =

Protein-coding gene in the species Homo sapiens

Identifiers
- Aliases: OR7D4, OR19-7, OR19-B, OR19B, OR7D4P, hg105, olfactory receptor family 7 subfamily D member 4
- External IDs: OMIM: 611538; MGI: 1313142; GeneCards: OR7D4

Gene location (Human)
Chr.	Chromosome 19 (human)
Band	19p13.2	Start	9,210,276 bp
Band	19p13.2	End	9,219,589 bp

Gene location (Mouse)
Chr.	Chromosome 9 (mouse)
Band	9 A3|9 7.51 cM	Start	20,193,647 bp
Band	9 A3|9 7.51 cM	End	20,198,874 bp
RNA expression pattern
Bgee	Human / Mouse (ortholog); Top expressed in: ganglionic eminence; renal cortex / Top expressed in: proximal tubule; More reference expression data
BioGPS	n/a
Gene ontology
Molecular function	G protein-coupled receptor activity; signal transducer activity; olfactory receptor activity
Cellular component	membrane; plasma membrane; integral component of membrane
Biological process	sensory perception of smell; detection of chemical stimulus involved in sensory perception of smell; signal transduction; response to stimulus; G protein-coupled receptor signaling pathway
Sources:Amigo / QuickGO
Orthologs
Databases	NCBI: entry; OMA: entry
Species	Human	Mouse
Entrez	125958	258822
Ensembl	ENSG00000174667	ENSMUSG00000059623
UniProt	Q8NG98	n/a
RefSeq (mRNA)	NM_001005191	NM_146825
RefSeq (protein)	NP_001005191	n/a
Location (UCSC)	Chr 19: 9.21 – 9.22 Mb	Chr 9: 20.19 – 20.2 Mb
PubMed search
- Wikidata
View/Edit Human	View/Edit Mouse

Olfactory receptor 7D4 is a protein that in humans is encoded by the OR7D4 gene.

== Function ==
Olfactory receptors interact with odorant molecules in the nose, to initiate a neuronal response that triggers the perception of a smell. The olfactory receptor proteins are members of a large family of G protein-coupled receptors (GPCR) arising from single coding-exon genes. Olfactory receptors share a 7-transmembrane domain structure with many neurotransmitter and hormone receptors and are responsible for the recognition and G protein-mediated transduction of odorant signals. The olfactory receptor gene family is the largest in the genome. The nomenclature assigned to the olfactory receptor genes and proteins for this organism is independent of other organisms.

== Ligands ==
- Androstadienone
- Androstenone

People with the OR7D4 R88W/T133M polymorphism are less sensitive to these odorants and find them less offensive smelling, as they are characteristically described as "sweaty".
