= Olfactic communication =

Social interaction through smell

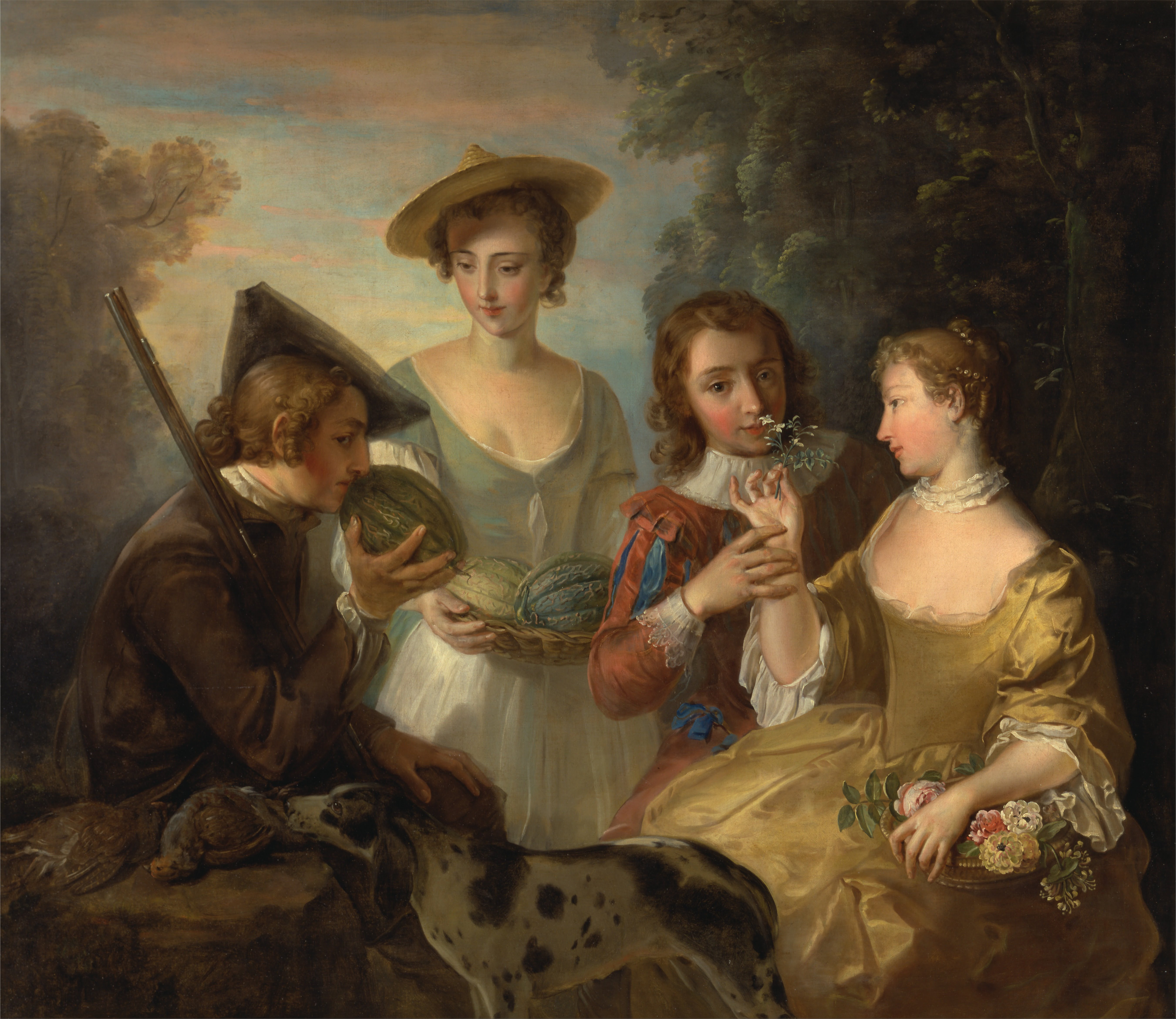
Sharing the sense of smell

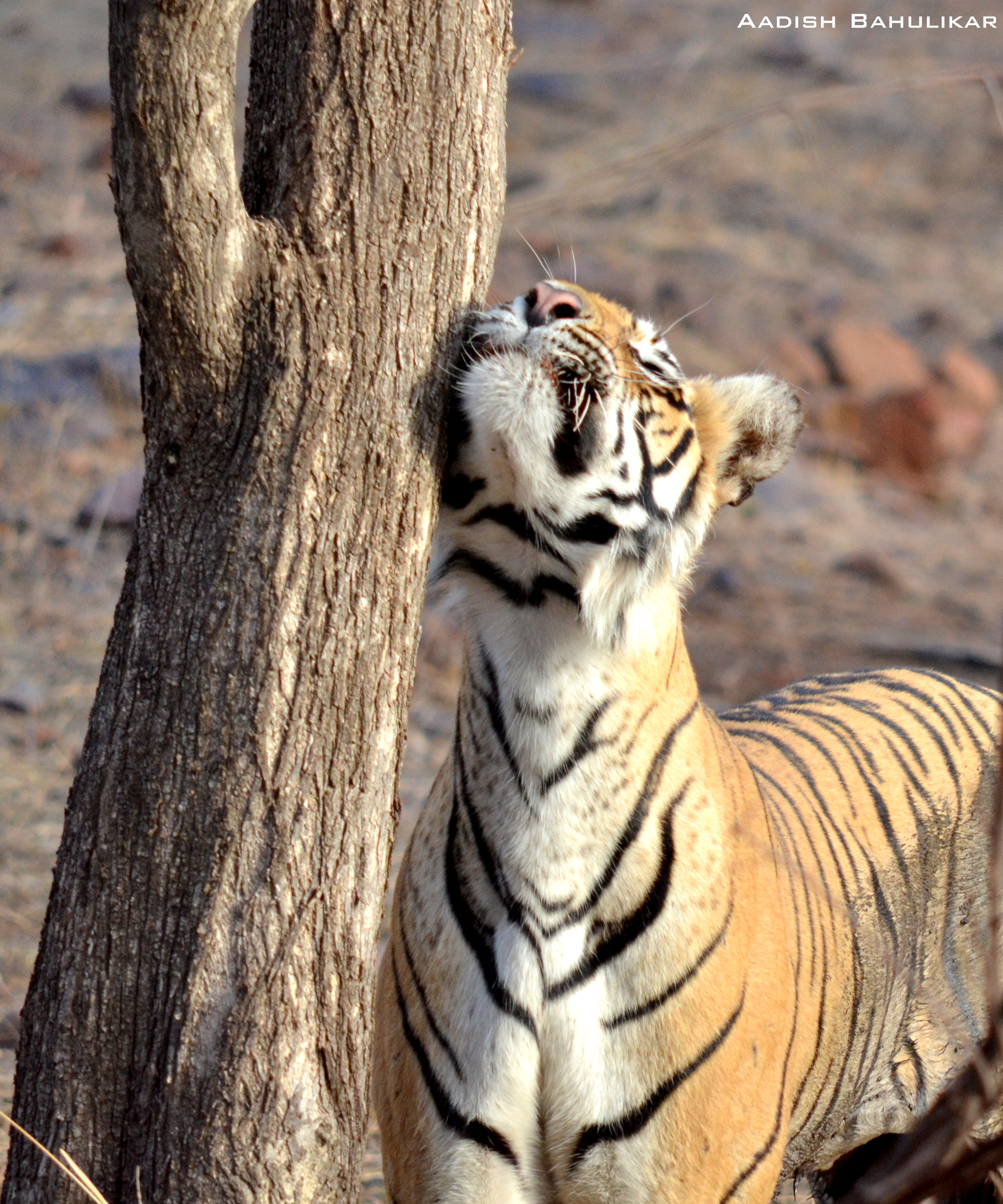
A tigress scent-rubbing on a tree

Olfactic communication is a channel of nonverbal communication referring to the various ways people and animals communicate and engage in social interaction through their sense of smell. The human olfactory sense is one of the most phylogenetically primitive and emotionally intimate of the five senses; the sensation of smell is thought to be the most matured and developed human sense.

Human ancestors essentially depended on their sense of smell to alert themselves of danger such as poisonous food and to locate potent mating partners. Using the sense of smell as an instrument paved a way for smell to become a platform of nonverbal communication. Smell also has a significant influence on social interactions. Through their branch of olfaction research, the National Science Foundation recorded that over 70 percent of American adults believe a person's body odor has a significant effect on how interested they will be when conversing with people of a different sex. This process is possible with olfactory bulbs, the part of the brain that discriminates and enhances certain odors. Typically, women will prefer men whose natural odor is similar to their own, while heterosexual men are attracted to females with high estrogen levels and strong menstrual secretions. An entire industry has been developed to provide people with personal smell-masking products, such as perfume, cologne, deodorant, and scented lotions. When a person covers their natural body odor with a pleasant smell, they are communicating their desire to be attractive either emotionally, sexually, or romantically.

== History ==
While olfactics were arguably the most critical sense of human biology for centuries, the first classification system for odors was not developed until the later half of the 1700s by Carolus Linnaeus; today, humans are most dependent on eyesight. Linnaeus' system was composed of seven different categories that various types of smells could be identified with. These categories are champhoraceous musky, floral, pepperminty, ethereal, pungent, and putrid. This classification system has been readvised numerous times and is still being developed to actively interpret human olfactics. Linnaeus' work sparked interest in several colleagues and other scientists, leading to theories of how olfactics are linked to a person's mood and emotional state. This led to the creation of scented room vaporizer in 1851. Eugene Remmel's room perfumer was originally designed to uplift or relax the occupants of the space. However, this invention instead rose to popularity for its simple ability of providing suitable air quality by ventilating small, heavily populated public places. Today, people use scented essential oils in their home or office to create a certain ambience. For example, peppermint is used to uplift dreary attitudes, citrus attracts motivational energy, vanilla is used to promote calmness, and lavender predicts relaxation. Sharing a scent with the entire room spreads a message of what atmosphere the host would like to set and in return, nonverbally communicates the manner in which the guests or visitors should act.

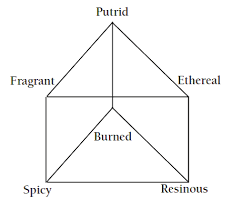
Illustration of Henning's Smell PrismImage originally released by the Water Environment Federation in 1978

In 1916, Hans Henning created a three dimensional smell-prism with six corners. Each corner represented a distinctive smell including flowery or ethereal, putrid, fruity or fragrant, spicy, burned, and resinous. Henning's theory suggested all other smells were a combination of these six and each smell occupied its own location on the prism. This prism led to new developments in understanding olfactics, however not everyone was satisfied with Henning's research. Today, there is still not a universally agreed upon standardized classification system for olfaction. This is primarily due to the drastic differences in how certain smells are perceived by various cultures. Although sufficient research is still being recorded to explain the connection between olfaction and preferences, experts have theorized that certain smells are connected to a person's thinking, creativity, memory, and reaction abilities. This is because when a person is experiencing a negative emotion, their olfaction sense sharpens. This creates a lasting memory, correlating the scent with a certain experience and emotions a person felt. The same patterns can be detected when a person feels joy, sadness, or fear.

== Personal perception ==
The attributions humans make through the olfactic channel have implications for their moral understanding of themselves and others and for the judgments and evaluations they make in identifying social class, status, sex, race, gender and ethnicity in their relationships. In humans, smell, inherent or applied, can affect acceptance of others, and places of business may be scented to encourage comfort or promote productivity.

Interpretation of smell varies internationally, a matter much overlooked and little studied formally as it pertains to communication, where it is often poorly coded in Western culture, in part because humans have a hard time identifying and describing smells. The academic researcher Asifa Majid argues that there is cross-cultural evidence that numerous languages use coding olfaction in their language to meet their environmental needs. Majid finds the Umpila, an Indigenous people of Australia, to have the most codeable olfactory sense in their language.

== Effects on other senses ==
Scent can transmit an intrinsic message. It can also transmit a message that relies on, or affects, other senses, such as:

=== Touch ===
The interactions between the touch and olfactic senses will dictate behavior due to the circumstances of where the interaction is set to occur. It could also be used with smell in an attempt to identify what a random or unknown object could be. For example, If a person were to walk into a room that did not smell good they would be less likely to interact with the environment around them. If a room smells welcoming and comforting a person would be more likely to stay longer and interact with more things. These examples provide a brief understanding on how smell may affect the behaviors or interactions behind certain senses.

=== Taste ===
Taste and smell go hand in hand as some of the main stimulants for flavor is the result that comes from smell working with taste. The human body has many complex interactions when it comes to how the five senses can help or hurt each other. These two senses can impact people's emotions and behaviors and can also cause pain depending on what the sense is being used for. These senses can also be positively or negatively affected by medication, disease, smoking, or drinking. For example, COVID-19 was well known for temporarily nullifying the sense of taste and smell. Olfactics can help dictate on whether or not something should be consumed, but at times the sense of smell can be fooled.

=== Sight ===
In a large survey study on the importance and attention to olfaction in daily life, Wrzesniewski et al. found that completely losing one's sense of smell was ranked as equivalent to losing one's little left toe or hearing in one ear. Sight is a common sense but when it comes to smelling what a person is surrounded by (i.e., environment). The sensory stimuli can affect a person's behavior when browsing through a grocery store, even in the environment. Odor can affect individuals subconscious mind and make a consumer become more allured to specific things. Visual dominance refers not only to neural processing but also to vision's cultural and social primacy.

=== Sound ===
With olfactics we perceive auditory cues in our everyday life. For instance: a person who struggles with halitosis. While talking to others, since people experience not only odors through the front of the nose or the back of the nose, but also sounds, auditory perceptions may be neglected or drawn out by the sense of smell. Of the five senses sound has the least impact on olfactic communication. With sound a person may be able to hear the sound of food cooking, though they must use their olfactory epithelium which contains special receptors that are sensitive to odor molecules that travel through the air.

== COVID-19 pandemic ==
As of March 2020, the COVID-19 outbreak left many individuals losing their sense of smell and/or taste, those that have had the feeling of loss in their senses were told to quarantine or severe isolation. Many people still to modern day are battling with loss of smell and taste and have upper respiratory problems. During the COVID-19 outbreak, patients with sudden loss of smell should initiate social distancing and home isolation measures and be tested for SARS-CoV-2 diagnostic test when available. Olfactory training is recommended when smell does not come back after one month but can be started earlier. The leading cause to the loss of smell is URTI, smell loss in URTI is caused by a multifactorial combination of mechanical obstruction for the odorant transmission in the olfactory cleft due to mucosal inflammation (cytokine storm) and shedding (neurodegeneration) of the olfactory neuro-epithelium which interfere with odorants binding to OR

== Romantic relationships ==
Smell plays an important largely nonconscious role in the process of physical and romantic attraction. From an evolutionary perspective, the most important human outcome is successful procreation and the production of healthy offspring capable of procreating themselves. One key factor in evolution is the development genes known as the major histocompatibility complex (MHC). MHC has evolved in humans to allow for individuals to distinguish compatibility efforts through smell when choosing a mate to ensure stronger immune systems for survival in offspring. To test the MHC theory, participants were invited to sniff dirty week-old t-shirts. Participants preferred the odor of the t-shirts that tended to have a genetically different MHC than their own. In ovulating women, it is found that their preference of smell in a male is more reliant on facial attractiveness, suggesting when a woman is at her most fertile smell becomes more crucial in the decision-making process. One way to ensure our offspring will be healthy and effective in this regard is for us to seek, find, and mate with healthy romantic partners. Thus, the process of natural selection has made us particularly attentive to the various signs indicative of the healthiest potential mates we can attract, and one's scent is a particularly important cue to sexual attraction in this regard.

== Animal communication ==
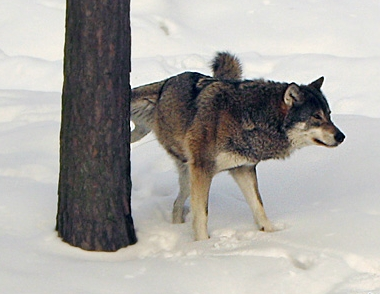
A gray wolf scent-marking his territory

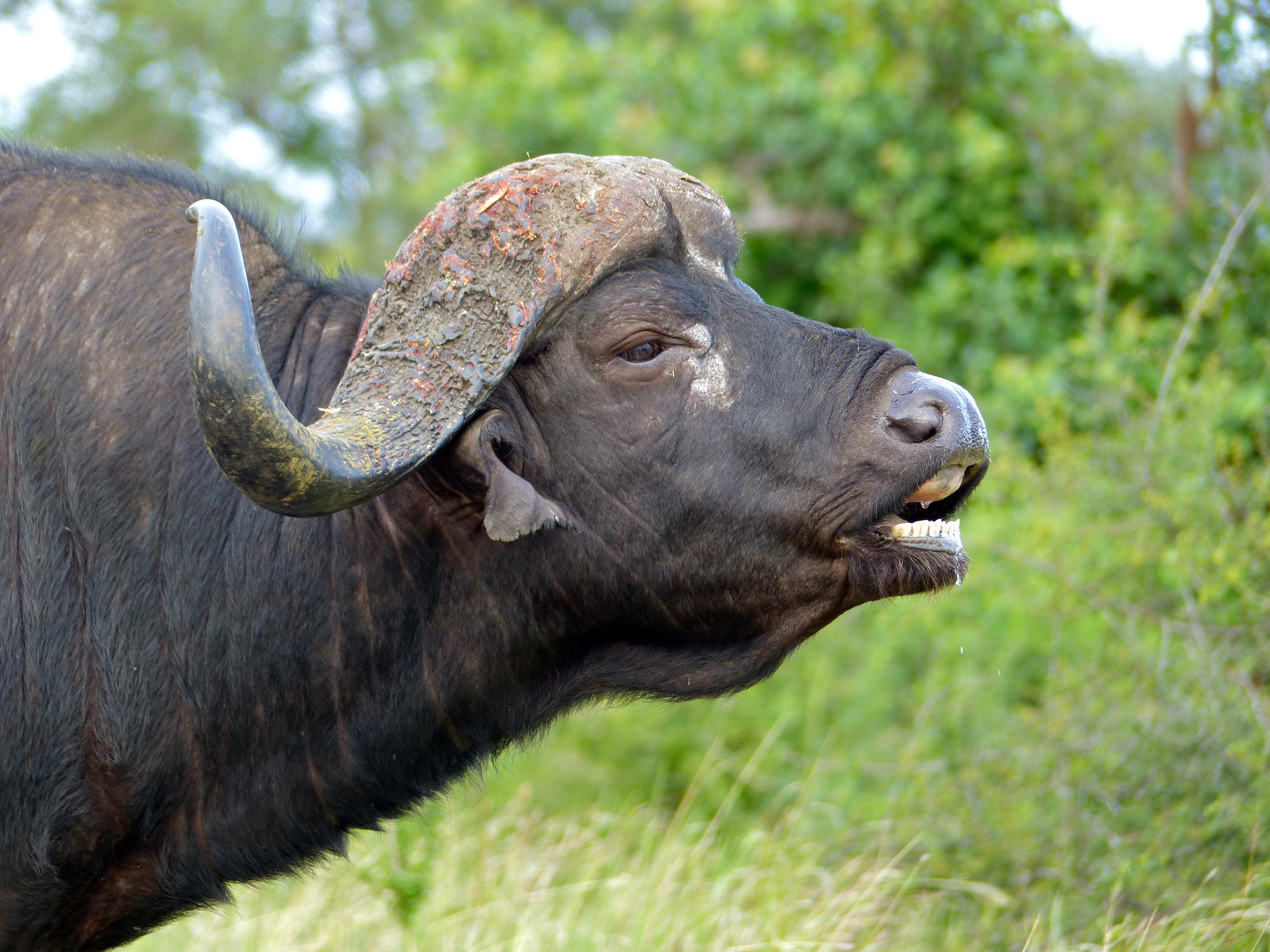
Flehmen response in an African buffalo

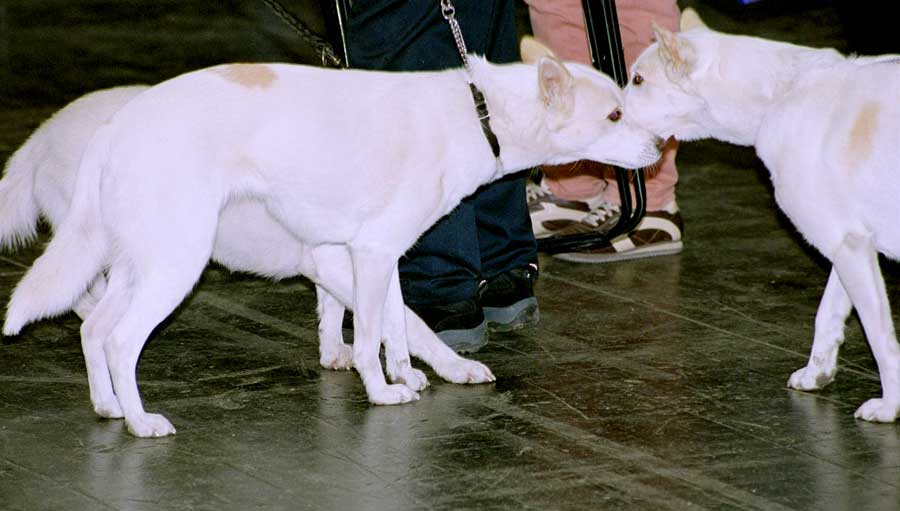
Two dogs sniffing each other

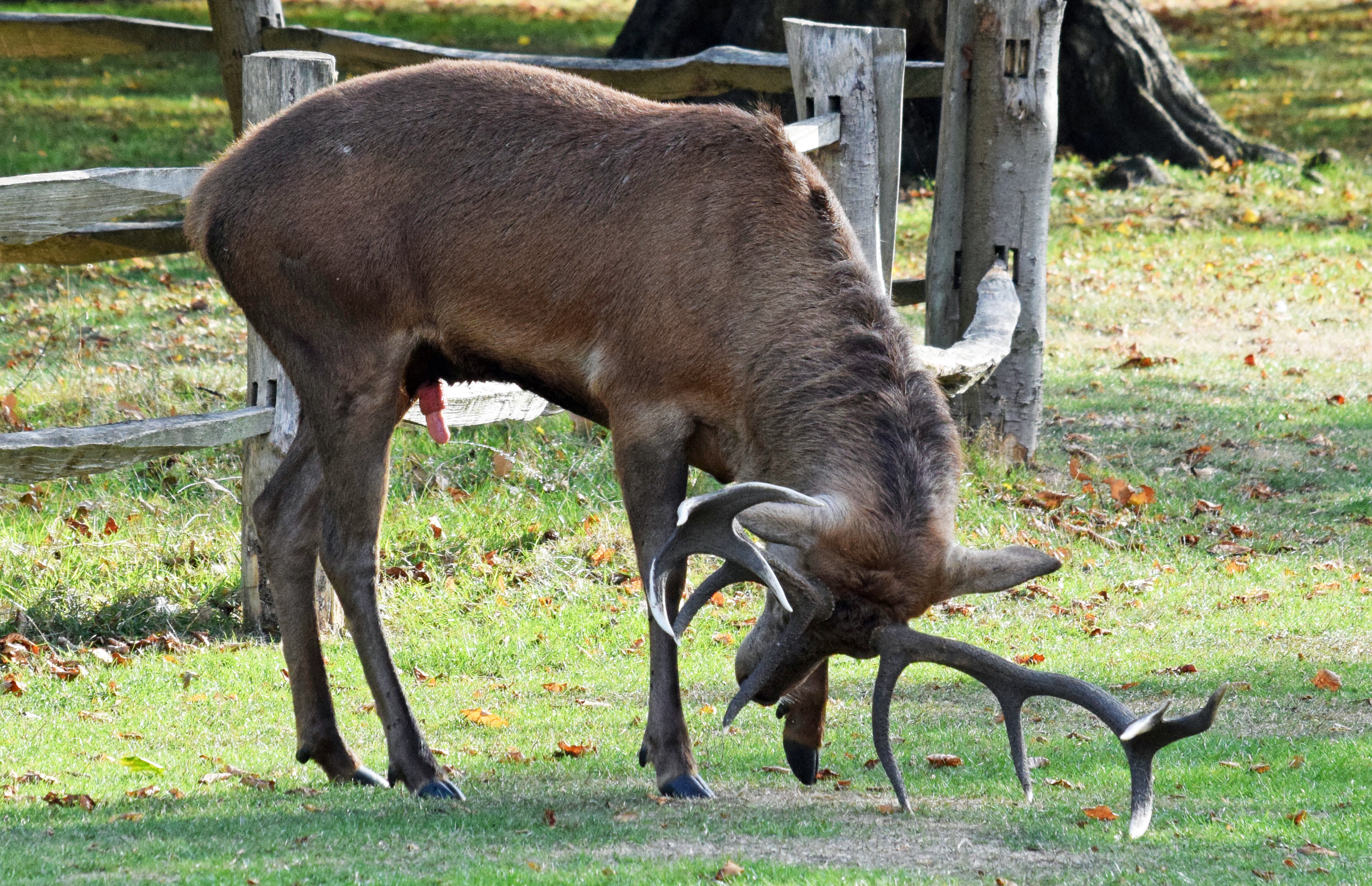
A stag anointing himself during the rut

In the animal kingdom, chemical communication or semiochemicals is received through the olfactory channel allowing for the animal to decode and recognize chemical signals. Among other animals, animal cognition research finds that dogs are more reliant on olfaction than any other sense. Dogs have a significantly larger olfactory epithelium with 30 percent more olfactory receptors than humans. Having more olfactory receptors that can recognize a much larger variety of odorants. Dogs rely on sniffing to gather past information on their surrounding environment through odour detection and identification allowing them to localize odors. Semiochemicals are "a substance excreted by an animal, to the outside of that individual, which is then received by another individual, classically of the same species, which then elicits some behavioral or developmental response related to the survival of the species."

Many mammals exhibit both odorant and vomeronasal sensitive organs. Pigs communicate through pheromones commonly and also display main olfactory epithelium response to some pheromones. Additionally in mice we see vomeronasal response from odors not produced by animals. Some mutant mice defective in VNO activity continue to display activity that is indicative of pheromone communication. Odorants and pheromones display many similarities. Additionally, it is seen in mice that the response to the presence of certain semiochemicals and odors can be learned. For example, a mouse is not aggressive to the scent of his own pheromones. However, when these pheromones are presented on another male mouse the aggressive behavior will be displayed. Mice form an olfactory memory which helps them define and react to the presence of pheromones. Humans have no VNO but still a level of communication through semiochemicals. These classes of pheromonal action are the opposite-sex attractants, the same-sex repellants (territorial markers), mother–infant bonding attractants and those modulating the timing of the fertile cycle. There is contradictory evidence supporting the hypothesis that humans use pheromones in order to regulate behavior through these four channels. Humans are capable of distinctly recognizing and empathizing with emotion identified from bodily odors.

Research done by Kokocińska-Kusiak A, Woszczyło M, Zybala M, Maciocha J, Barłowska K, Dzięcioł M (August 2021), found that dogs can transmit messages through semiochemicals in urine marking among their environment leaving a "scent mark" for other animals to decode later on. In male dogs and wolves, urine-marking used more frequently in unknown areas and the practice is even continued when there is no urine left, meaning the passing of semiochemicals is not strictly tied to the act of urination. Animal behaviors can be altered by chemical stimuli. Chemical stimuli is a crucial source of information that elicits different behavioral responses from aquatic invertebrates. For example, in Elyssa Rosen's research she was able to find that hermit crabs have different reactions to water that has been previously occupied by a potential predatory and non-predatory crabs. It is important for hermit crabs to be able to decode these chemical stimuli in order to understand if the territory is safe to occupy. The perfect environment to receive semiochemicals is through humidity and light sun. Elements that can negatively disrupt the chemical communication channel is heavy rain in the environment because it brings the scents hanging in the air and burying them into the ground as well as fog that causes a scent to diffuse and linger in the air which can cause confusion.

== Emotion ==
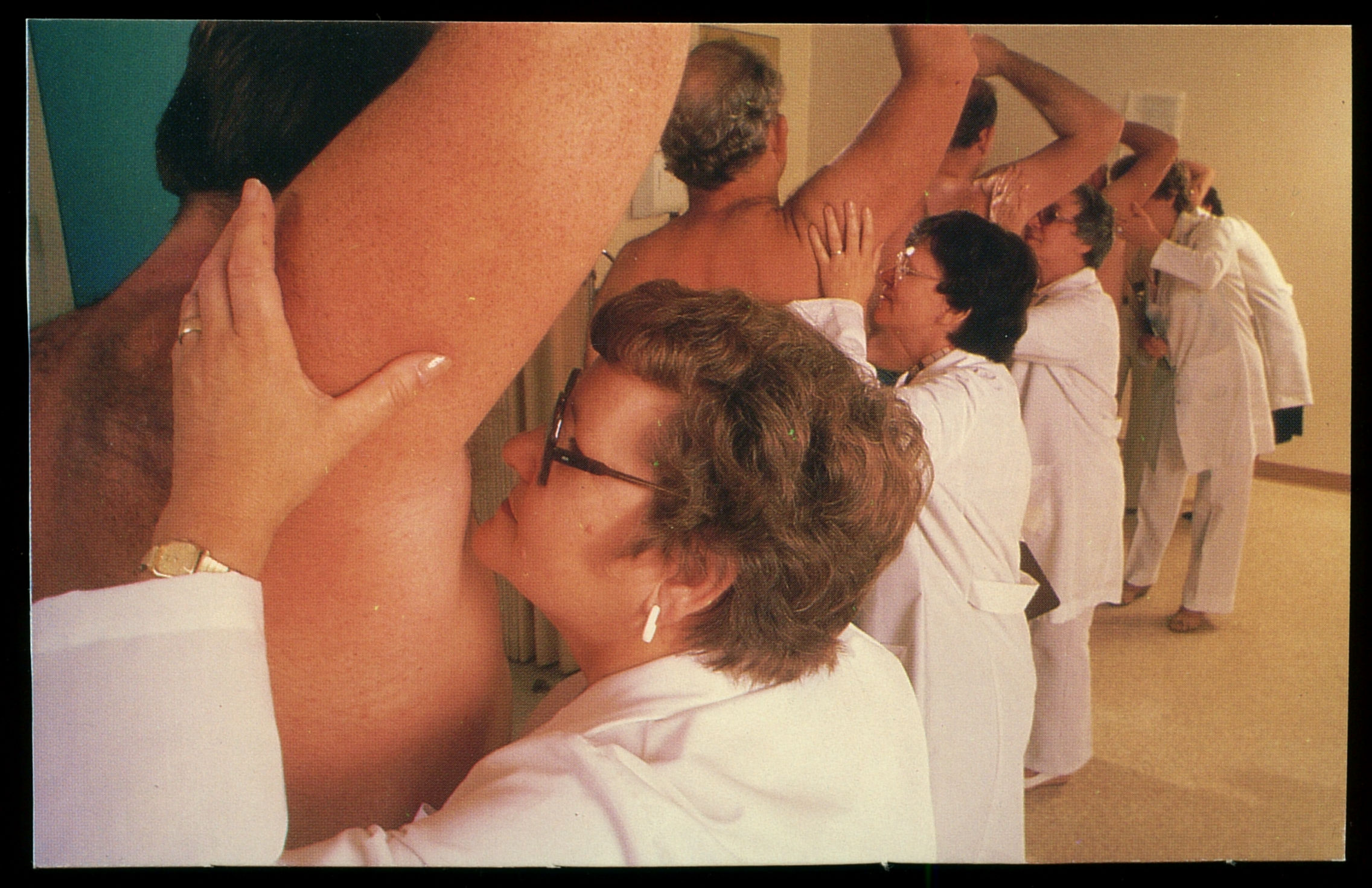
Lautenberg Laboratories is the leader in controlled environment beta testing for the personal hygiene and pharmaceutical industry.

Natural human body odors may also carry emotional information that can be decoded by others which allows for communication. In one study, study groups placed cotton gauze into their armpit and were shown fear or happiness inducing videos. Later the sweat samples were given to participants of the opposite sex. They were able to determine the emotional state of the donor at "above chance levels." Researcher Denise Chen and Jeanneette Haviland-Jones's findings the happiness odors can be detected more frequently by women than men. Disgust and fear both have identifiable and distinguishable scents. Should an individual be exposed to the scent of fear (in this case sweat samples from first time skydivers) various parts of the brain are activated: the amygdala and hypothalamus primarily. Additionally, the insula (which processes sensory and emotional information), the fusiform gyrus (which plays a key role in face and object recognition), and the cingulate cortex (which helps regulate responses to pain and emotion). Activating the appropriate regions of the brain when the brain recognizes the presence of applicable semiochemicals allows for more cognition.

Olfactic cues can impact the degree of cooperativeness of an individual. Generally, men are rated as more selfish and less cooperative when presented with a masculine scent. This scent contained higher concentrations of androstadienone. Scent donors were rated on cooperativeness before the sample was taken, and this sample had a positive correlation to the cooperativeness of the subject in a later test. The exact compounds produced in relation to cooperativeness require further investigation.
