= C18H22O =

The molecular formula C_{18}H_{22}O (molar mass: 254.37 g/mol, exact mass: 254.1671 u) may refer to:

- Enzacamene (4-MBC)
- Estratetraenol, or estra-1,3,5(10),16-tetraen-3-ol
