= C19H30O =

The molecular formula C_{19}H_{30}O (molar mass: 274.44 g/mol, exact mass: 274.2297 u) may refer to:

- 3α-Androstenol
- 3β-Androstenol, also known as 5α-androst-16-en-3β-ol
