= Androstadienol =

Chemical compound

Clinical data
- Other names: 5,16-Androstadien-3β-ol
- ATC code: None

Identifiers
- IUPAC name: (3S,8S,9S,10R,13R,14S)-10,13-dimethyl-2,3,4,7,8,9,10,11,12,13,14,15-dodecahydro-1H-cyclopenta[a]phenanthren-3-ol
- CAS Number: 1224-94-8
- PubChem CID: 150900
- ChemSpider: 133002
- CompTox Dashboard (EPA): DTXSID40924155

Chemical and physical data
- Formula: C_{19}H_{28}O
- Molar mass: 272.432 g·mol^{−1}
- 3D model (JSmol): Interactive image
- SMILES: C[C@@]12CC[C@H]3[C@@H](CC=C4C[C@@H](O)CC[C@]34C)[C@@H]2CC=C1
- InChI: InChI=1S/C19H28O/c1-18-9-3-4-16(18)15-6-5-13-12-14(20)7-11-19(13,2)17(15)8-10-18/h3,5,9,14-17,20H,4,6-8,10-12H2,1-2H3/t14-,15-,16-,17-,18-,19-/m0/s1; Key:QVHPTAJAHUONLV-DYKIIFRCSA-N

Androstadienol, or androsta-5,16-dien-3β-ol, is a 16-androstene class endogenous steroid, pheromone, and chemical intermediate to several other pheromones that is found in the sweat of both men and women.

Androstadienol and androstadienone are odorless compounds secreted by the apocrine glands, and via conversion into the more powerfully-odorous androstenone and androstenol (catalyzed by aerobic corynebacteria, particularly Corynebacterium xerosis, in men, and Micrococcaceae spp. in women), are considered to be mainly responsible for the "musky" component of axillary (underarm) odor. Androstadienol is synthesized from pregnenolone by the 16-ene-synthetase activity of CYP17A1, and is converted into androstadienone by 3β-hydroxysteroid dehydrogenase. Male sweat contains approximately five times as much androstenone as does female sweat, which can be explained by sex differences in androstadienol and androstadienone production.

Androstadienone, which is produced from androstadienol, has been found to affect brain activity. Specifically, it has been found to activate the hypothalamus, most maximally the medial preoptic and anterior hypothalamic areas, in heterosexual women and homosexual men, but not in heterosexual men (who instead experienced hypothalamic activation in response to smelling estratetraenol, an estrogen-related pheromone, while heterosexual women and homosexual men did not). It has also been found to activate the anterior area of the inferior lateral prefrontal cortex, the superior temporal cortex, and olfactory areas. The affected brain areas are thought to be involved in sexual behavior, attention, visual perception/recognition, and social cognition.

== See also ==
- List of neurosteroids § Pheromones and pherines
