= 3β-Androstenol =

Chemical compound

Names
- IUPAC name 5α-Androst-16-en-3β-ol
- Systematic IUPAC name (3aS,3bR,5aS,7S,9aS,9bS,11aR)-9a,11a-Dimethyl-3a,3b,4,5,5a,6,7,8,9,9a,9b,10,11,11a-tetradecahydro-3H-cyclopenta[a]phenanthren-7-ol

Identifiers
CAS Number	7148-51-8
3D model (JSmol)	Interactive image
ChemSpider	133479
PubChem CID	151449
UNII	EPQ9QH9KXZ
CompTox Dashboard (EPA)	DTXSID90905050
- InChI: InChI=1S/C19H30O/c1-18-9-3-4-16(18)15-6-5-13-12-14(20)7-11-19(13,2)17(15)8-10-18/h3,9,13-17,20H,4-8,10-12H2,1-2H3/t13-,14-,15-,16-,17-,18-,19-/m0/s1 Key: KRVXMNNRSSQZJP-LOVVWNRFSA-N
- SMILES: C[C@]12CC[C@H]3[C@H]([C@@H]1CC=C2)CC[C@@H]4[C@@]3(CC[C@@H](C4)O)C

Properties
Chemical formula	C_{19}H_{30}O
Molar mass	274.448 g·mol^{−1}
- Except where otherwise noted, data are given for materials in their standard state (at 25 °C [77 °F], 100 kPa). Infobox references

3β-Androstenol, also known as 5α-androst-16-en-3β-ol, is a naturally occurring mammalian pheromone known to be present in humans and pigs. It is thought to play a role in axillary odor. It is produced from androstenone via the enzyme 3β-hydroxysteroid dehydrogenase. Unlike its C3α epimer 3α-androstenol, 3β-androstenol shows no potentiation of the GABA_{A} receptor or anticonvulsant activity.

== See also ==
- List of neurosteroids § Pheromones and pherines
- C_{19}H_{30}O
