= Sex pheromone =

Released by an organism to attract an individual of the opposite sex

Sex pheromones are pheromones released by an organism to attract an individual of the same species, encourage it to mate with it, or perform some other function closely related with sexual reproduction. Sex pheromones specifically focus on indicating females for breeding, attracting the opposite sex, and conveying information on species, age, sex and genotype. Non-volatile pheromones, or cuticular contact pheromones, are more closely related to social insects as they are usually detected by direct contact with chemoreceptors on the antennae or feet of insects.

Insect sex pheromones have found uses in monitoring and trapping of pest insects.

== Evolution ==
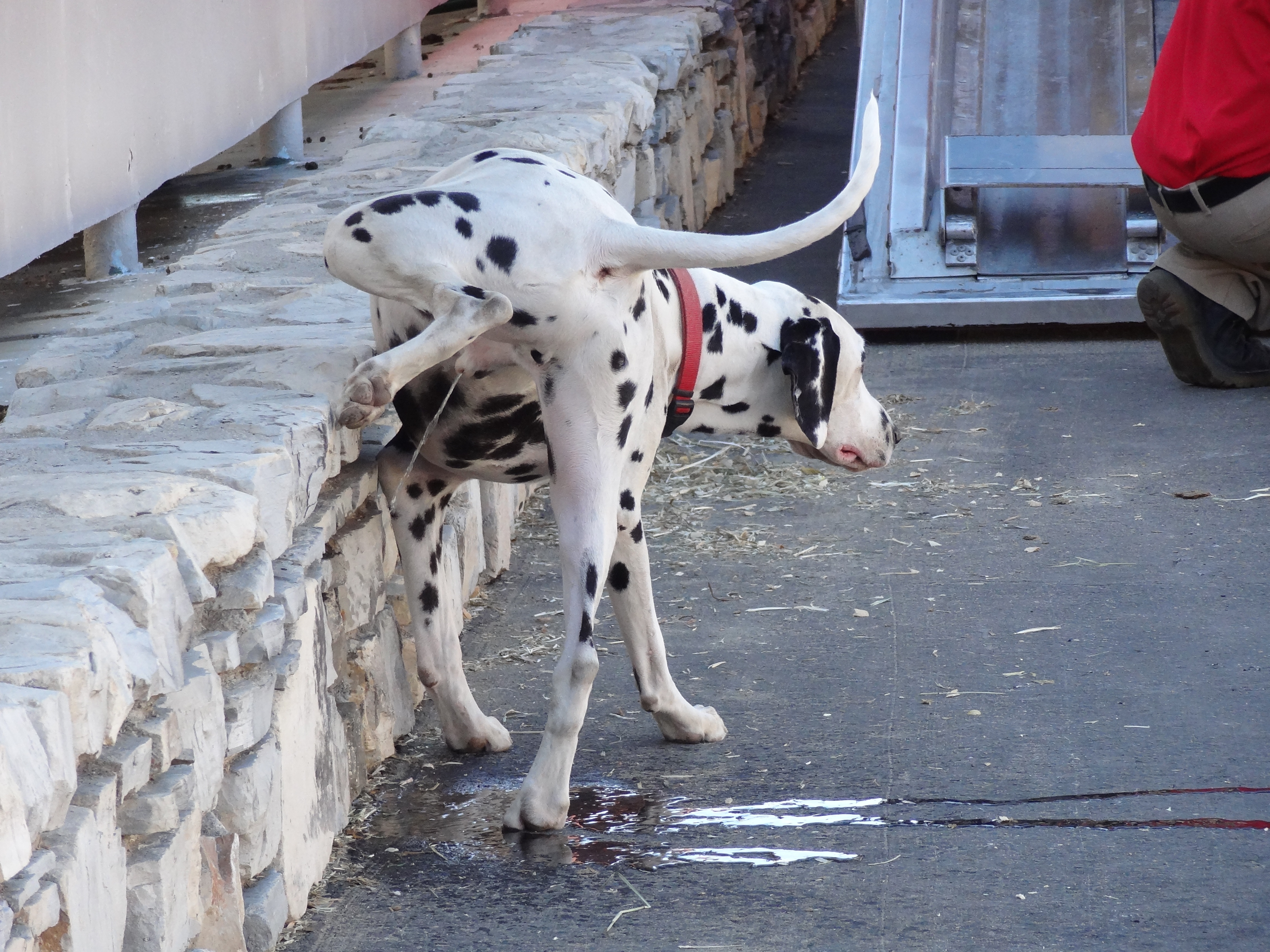
Dogs excrete sex pheromones in urine.

Sex pheromones have evolved in many species. The many types of pheromones (i.e. alarm, aggregation, defense, sexual attraction) all have a common cause acting as chemical cues to trigger a response. However, sex pheromones are particularly associated with signaling mating behaviors or dominance. The odors released can be seen as a favorable trait selected by either the male or female leading to attraction and copulation. Chemical signaling is also used to find genetically different mates and thus avoid inbreeding. Females are often selective when deciding to mate, and chemical communication ensures that they find a high-quality mate that satisfies their reproductive needs.

=== Sexual selection ===
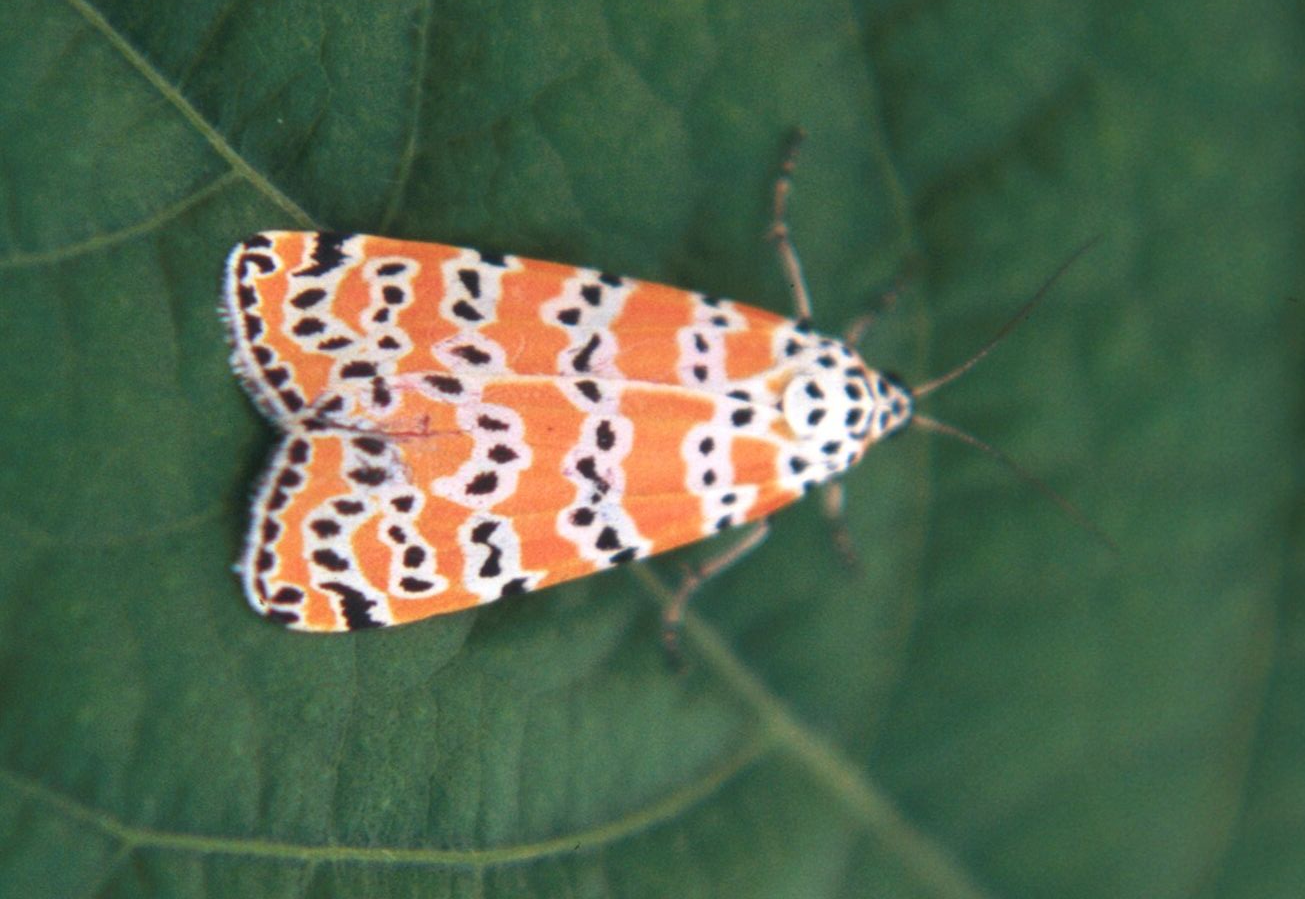
Females of the tiger moth Utetheisa ornatrix choose males that produce more pheromones.

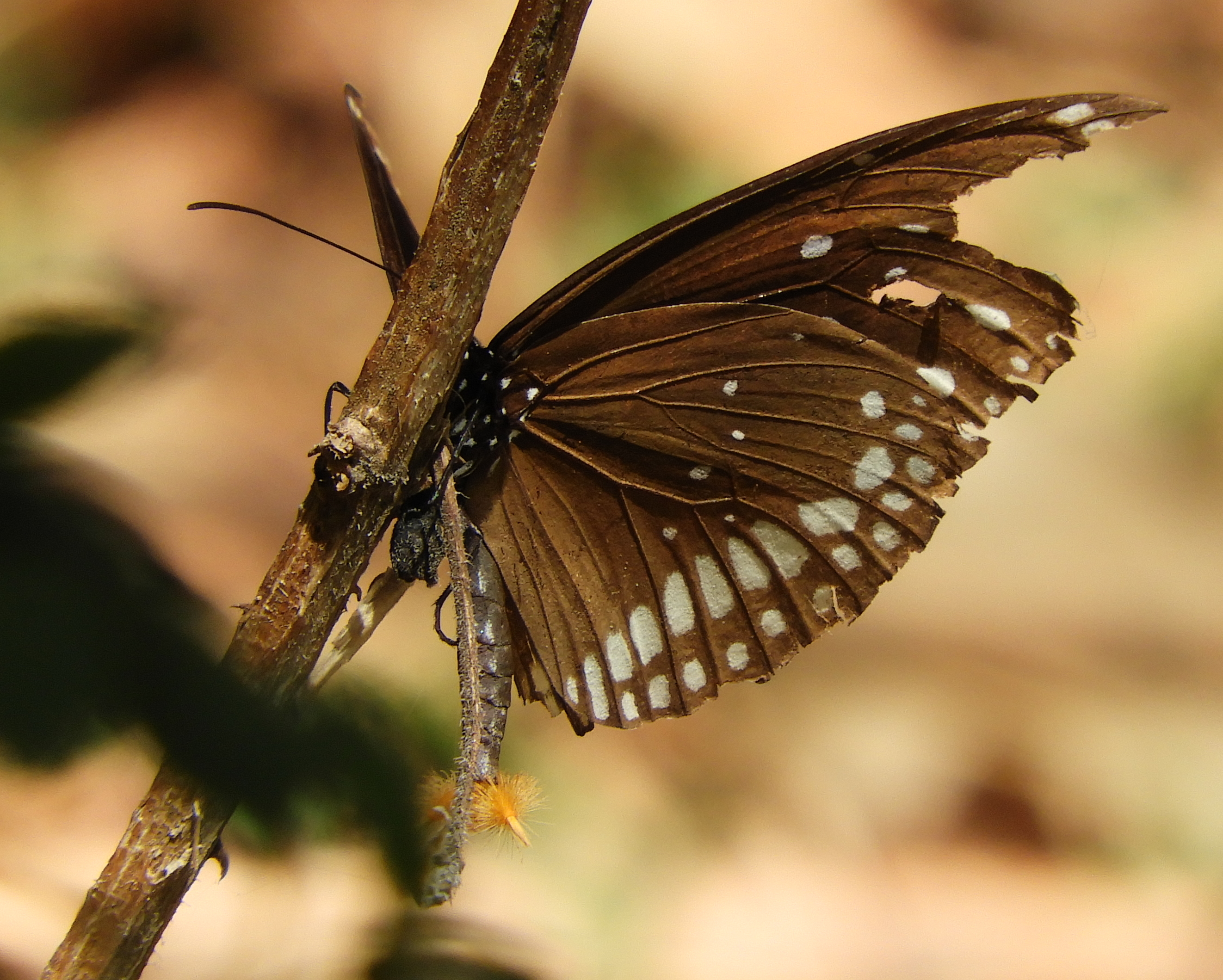
Common crow butterfly male (Euploea core) with hair pencils everted to disperse sex pheromone.

Odours may be a kind of male "ornament" selected for by female choice. They meet the criteria for such ornaments that Charles Darwin set out in The Descent of Man, and Selection in Relation to Sex. After many years of study the importance of such chemical communication is becoming clear.

Males usually compete for scarce females, which make adaptive choices based on male traits. The choice can benefit the female directly and/or genetically. In tiger moths (Utetheisa ornatrix), females choose the males that produce the most pheromone; an honest signal of the amount of protective alkaloids the male has, as well as an indicator of the size of female offspring (females fertilised by such males lay more eggs). Male cockroaches form dominance hierarchies based on pheromone "badges", while females use the same pheromone for male choice. In oriental beetles (Exomala Orientalis), females release the pheromone and passively wait for a male to find them. The males with superior detection and flying abilities are most likely to reach the female beetle first which leads to a selection for genetically-advantageous males.

In most species, pheromones are released by the non-limiting sex. Some female moths signal, but this is cheap and low risk; it means the male has to fly to her, taking a high risk. This mirrors communication with other sensory modalities, e.g. male frogs croak; male birds are usually colourful. Male long-range pheromone signals may be associated with patchy resources for the female. In some species, both sexes signal. Males can sometimes attract other males instead, the sex pheromone acting as an aggregation pheromone.

=== External fertilization and chemical duets ===
It is likely that most externally fertilizing species (e.g. marine worms, sea urchins) coordinate their sexual behaviour (release of sperm and eggs) using pheromones. This coordination is very important because sperm are diluted easily, and are short-lived. Coordination therefore provides a selective advantage to both males and females: individuals that do not coordinate are unlikely to achieve fertilisation and hence to leave offspring.

The main selective advantage of outcrossing is that it promotes the masking of deleterious recessive alleles, while inbreeding promotes their harmful expression.

=== In humans ===
No study has led to the isolation of true human sex pheromones. While humans are highly dependent upon visual cues, when in close proximity, smells also play a role in sociosexual behaviors. An inherent difficulty in studying human pheromones is the need for cleanliness and odorlessness in human participants.

== Signalling ==
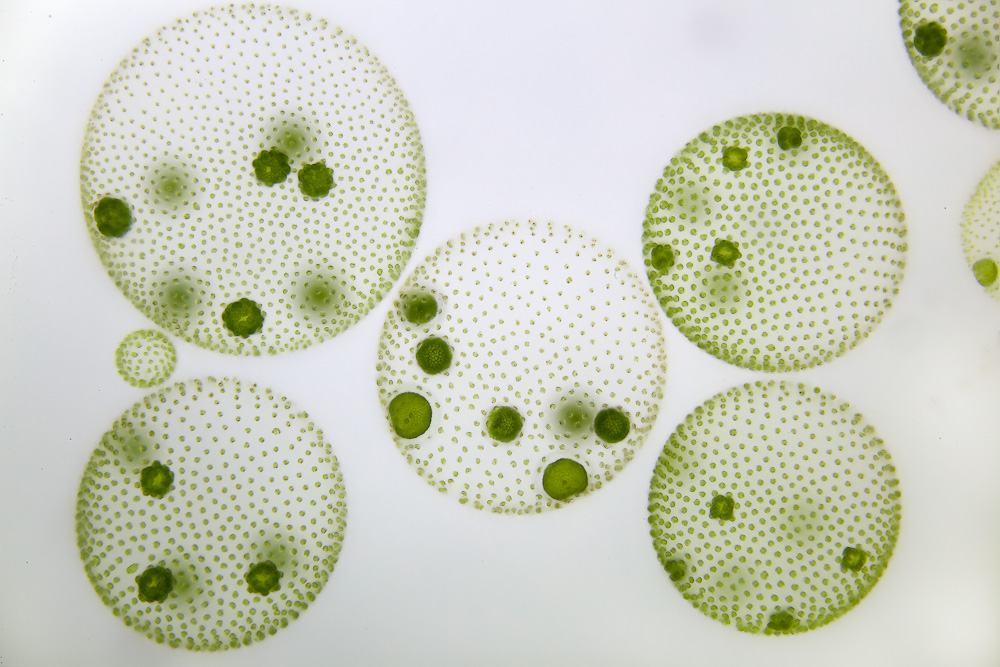
Sexual development in the freshwater alga Volvox is triggered by tiny concentrations of a glycoprotein pheromone.

Different species use a wide variety of chemical substances to send sexual signals. The first to be described chemically was bombykol, the silkworm moth's sex pheromone, which is a complex alcohol, (E,Z)-10,12-hexadecadienol, discovered in 1959. It is detected in the antennae of the male moth by a pheromone-binding protein which carries the bombykol to a receptor bound to the membrane of a nerve cell. The chemicals used by other moths are species-specific. For example, the Eastern spruce budworm Choristoneura fumiferana female pheromones contain a 95:5 mix of E- and Z 11-tetradecenal aldehydes, while the sex pheromones of other species of spruce budworm contain acetates and alcohols.

Sexual development in the freshwater green alga Volvox is initiated by a glycoprotein pheromone. It is one of the most potent known biological effector molecules, as it can trigger sexual development at a concentration as low as 10^{−16} moles per litre. Kirk and Kirk showed that sex-inducing pheromone production can be triggered experimentally in somatic cells by heat shock.

== Uses ==
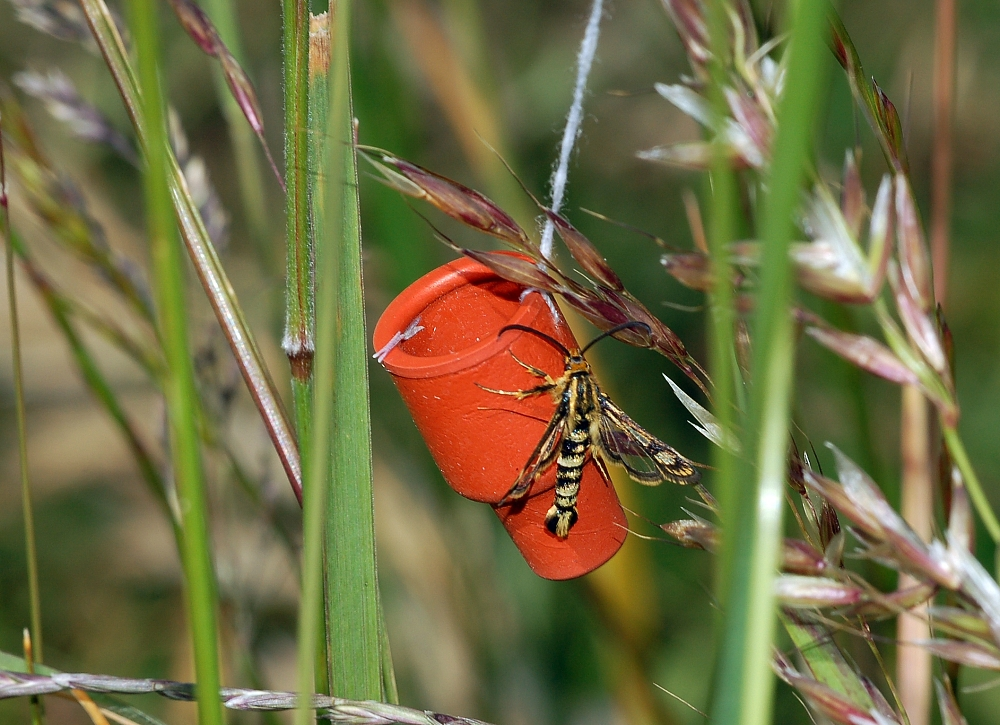
A pheromone trap in use to monitor insect pests

Sex pheromones have found applications in pest monitoring and pest control. For monitoring, pheromone traps are used to attract and catch a sample of pest insects to determine whether control measures are needed. For control, much larger quantities of a sex pheromone are released to disrupt the mating of a pest species. This can be either by releasing enough pheromone to prevent males from finding females, effectively drowning out their signals, or by mass trapping, attracting and removing pests directly. For example, research on the control of the spruce bud moth (Zeiraphera canadensis) has focused on the use of the pheromone E-9-tetradecenyl-acetate, a chemical the spruce bud moth releases during mating.
