= Lophenol =

Names
- IUPAC name (3S,4S,5S,9R,10S,13R,14R,17R)-4,10,13-trimethyl-17-[(2R)-6-methylheptan-2-yl]-2,3,4,5,6,9,11,12,14,15,16,17-dodecahydro-1H-cyclopenta[a]phenanthren-3-ol

Identifiers
CAS Number	481-25-4
3D model (JSmol)	Interactive image
ChEBI	CHEBI:18378
ChemSpider	141024
KEGG	C08825
PubChem CID	160482
UNII	X4BL075LYS
CompTox Dashboard (EPA)	DTXSID70963996
- InChI: InChI=1S/C28H48O/c1-18(2)8-7-9-19(3)22-12-13-24-21-10-11-23-20(4)26(29)15-17-28(23,6)25(21)14-16-27(22,24)5/h10,18-20,22-26,29H,7-9,11-17H2,1-6H3/t19-,20+,22-,23+,24+,25+,26+,27-,28+/m1/s1 Key: LMYZQUNLYGJIHI-SPONXPENSA-N
- SMILES: C[C@@H]1[C@H](CC[C@]2([C@H]1CC=C3[C@@H]2CC[C@]4([C@H]3CC[C@@H]4[C@H](C)CCCC(C)C)C)C)O

Properties
Chemical formula	C_{28}H_{48}O
Molar mass	400.691 g·mol^{−1}
- Except where otherwise noted, data are given for materials in their standard state (at 25 °C [77 °F], 100 kPa). Infobox references

Lophenol, or 4α-methyllathosterol, also called 4-Methylcholest-7-en-3-ol, is a Metabolic intermediate of plant sterol biosynthesis.

== See also ==
- 24-Methylenelophenol
- Lathosterol
