= 3-Ketosteroid reductase =

Enzyme

3-keto-steroid reductase

Identifiers
- EC no.: 1.1.1.270
- CAS no.: 42616-29-5

Databases
- IntEnz: IntEnz view
- BRENDA: BRENDA entry
- ExPASy: NiceZyme view
- KEGG: KEGG entry
- MetaCyc: metabolic pathway
- PRIAM: profile
- PDB structures: RCSB PDB PDBe PDBsum
- Gene Ontology: AmiGO / QuickGO
Search
- PMC: articles
- PubMed: articles
- NCBI: proteins

In enzymology, 3-keto-steroid reductase (EC 1.1.1.270) is an enzyme that catalyzes the reduction of keto sterols to the corresponding 3β-hydroxysteroids. For example:

lophenol
+ NADP^{+}
H^{+}
H^{+}
4α-methyllathosterone
+ NADPH

In this example, the two substrates of the enzyme are lophenol and oxidised nicotinamide adenine dinucleotide phosphate (NADP^{+}). Its products are 4α-methyllathosterone, reduced NADPH, and a proton.

This enzyme belongs to the family of oxidoreductases, specifically those acting on the CH-OH group of donor with NAD^{+} or NADP^{+} as acceptor. The systematic name of this enzyme class is 3beta-hydroxy-steroid:NADP^{+} 3-oxidoreductase. This enzyme is also called 3-KSR. This enzyme participates in biosynthesis of steroids.
