= Androstenol =

Mammalian pheromone also found in truffles

Clinical data
- ATC code: none

Identifiers
- IUPAC name: (2R,5R,7S,15R)-2,15-Dimethyltetracyclo[8.7.0.0^{2,7}.0^{11,15}]heptadec-13-en-5-ol
- CAS Number: 1153-51-1
- PubChem CID: 101989
- IUPHAR/BPS: 2761
- DrugBank: DB01889
- ChemSpider: 92136
- UNII: 48K9VAM062
- ChEBI: CHEBI:40933
- ChEMBL: ChEMBL142348
- CompTox Dashboard (EPA): DTXSID2075394
- ECHA InfoCard: 100.013.248

Chemical and physical data
- Formula: C_{19}H_{30}O
- Molar mass: 274.448 g·mol^{−1}
- 3D model (JSmol): Interactive image
- SMILES: C[C@]12CC[C@H]3[C@H]([C@@H]1CC=C2)CC[C@@H]4[C@@]3(CC[C@H](C4)O)C
- InChI: InChI=1S/C19H30O/c1-18-9-3-4-16(18)15-6-5-13-12-14(20)7-11-19(13,2)17(15)8-10-18/h3,9,13-17,20H,4-8,10-12H2,1-2H3/t13-,14+,15-,16-,17-,18-,19-/m0/s1; Key:KRVXMNNRSSQZJP-PHFHYRSDSA-N

Androstenol, also known as 5α-androst-16-en-3α-ol (shortened to 3α,5α-androstenol or 3α-androstenol), is a 16-androstene class steroidal pheromone and neurosteroid in humans and other mammals, notably pigs. It possesses a characteristic musk-like odor.

Androstenol, or a derivative, is found in black truffles. This was offered as an explanation for how pigs locate them deep in the ground: Androstenol is produced in the saliva of male pigs. However, experiments in France using pigs to scent truffles, truffle scent extract, and purified androstenol showed that pigs responded to the first two (actually trying to eat dirt containing the truffle extract), but ignored the androstenol.

A stereoisomer of androstenol, 3β-androstenol (5α-androst-16-en-3β-ol), is also endogenous to humans (as well as to pigs), behaving as a pheromone and contributing to axillary odor.

== Biosynthesis ==
In humans and boars, androstenol is biosynthesized in the testes. Pregnenolone is metabolized into androstadienol by the 16-ene-synthetase activity of CYP17A1. Androstadienol is then sequentially converted into androstenol by 3β-hydroxysteroid dehydrogenase (androstadienol to androstadienone), 5α-reductase (androstadienone to androstenone), and 3α-hydroxysteroid dehydrogenase (androstenone to androstenol), in a manner analogous to the biosynthesis of 3α-androstanediol from dehydroepiandrosterone (DHEA). Androstenol may also be synthesized in the adrenal glands and the ovaries in humans. In addition, androstenol may be synthesized in the human nasal mucosa from androstenone, and likely also from androstadienol and androstadienone in this area.

== Distribution ==
Considerable amounts of androstenol are present in human urine, and it is also present in the blood plasma and saliva of humans and pigs as well as in the axillary sweat of humans. Due to its ability to cross the blood–brain barrier, androstenol is likely present in the central nervous system as well.

== Biological activity ==
Androstenol, similarly to the related endogenous steroids 3α-androstanediol and androsterone, has been found to act as a potent positive allosteric modulator of the GABA_{A}. It has been proposed that this action may mediate the pheromone effects of androstenol. Moreover, as androstadienol, androstadienone, and androstenone are all converted into androstenol, it could mediate their pheromone effects as well. In animals, androstenol has been found to produce anxiolytic-like, antidepressant-like, and anticonvulsant effects. Androstenol has also been found to modify the behavioral and social responses of humans. In addition, androstenol has been found to decrease luteinizing hormone (LH) pulse frequency during the follicular phase of the human menstrual cycle. In accordance, it has been proposed that androstenol may be involved in the menstrual synchrony of women.

In contrast to androstenol (3α-androstenol), its 3β-epimer, 3β-androstenol, does not potentiate the GABA_{A} receptor, even at high concentrations. This is in accordance with other 3β-hydroxy steroids, including isopregnanolone, epipregnanolone, 3β-dihydroprogesterone, and 3β-androstanediol, which similarly do not act as such, in contrast to their 3α-hydroxy variants.

Androstenol is an antagonist of the constitutive androstane receptor (CAR). Androstenol has minimal or no androgenic activity.

== See also ==
- List of neurosteroids § Pheromones and pherines
- C_{19}H_{30}O
