= Androstadienone =

Chemical compound

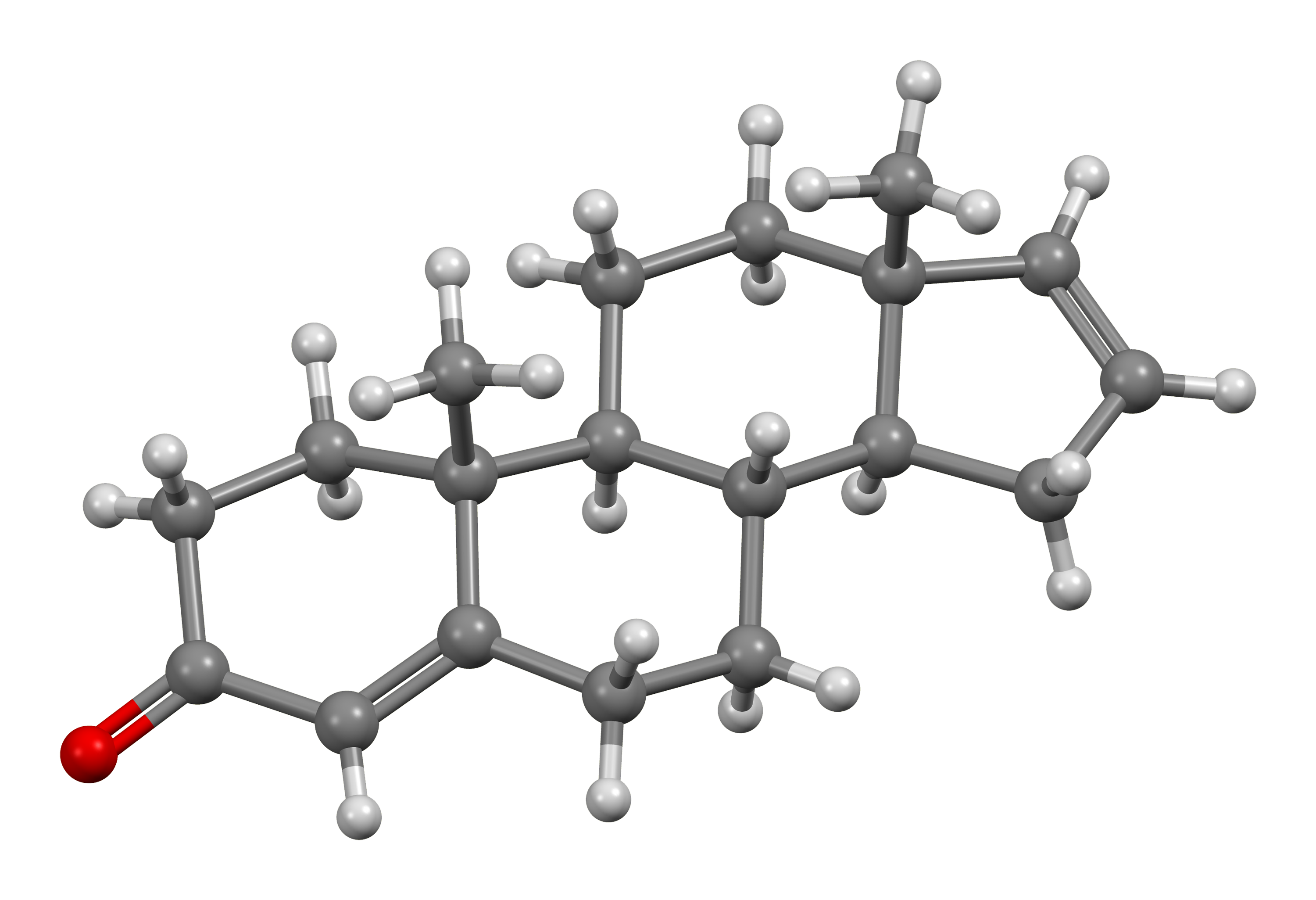

Clinical data
- ATC code: none

Identifiers
- IUPAC name: (8S,9S,10R,13R,14S)-10,13-dimethyl-1,2,6,7,8,9,11,12,14,15-decahydrocyclopenta[a]phenanthren-3-one
- CAS Number: 4075-07-4
- PubChem CID: 92979
- ChemSpider: 83932
- UNII: ZUZ4FHD36E
- CompTox Dashboard (EPA): DTXSID00863314

Chemical and physical data
- Formula: C_{19}H_{26}O
- Molar mass: 270.416 g·mol^{−1}
- 3D model (JSmol): Interactive image
- SMILES: C[C@]12CC[C@H]3[C@H]([C@@H]1CC=C2)CCC4=CC(=O)CC[C@]34C
- InChI: InChI=1S/C19H26O/c1-18-9-3-4-16(18)15-6-5-13-12-14(20)7-11-19(13,2)17(15)8-10-18/h3,9,12,15-17H,4-8,10-11H2,1-2H3/t15-,16-,17-,18-,19-/m0/s1; Key:HNDHDMOSWUAEAW-VMXHOPILSA-N

Androstadienone, or androsta-4,16-dien-3-one, is a 16-androstene class endogenous steroid that has been described as having potent pheromone-like activities in humans. The compound is synthesized from androstadienol by 3β-hydroxysteroid dehydrogenase, and can be converted into androstenone (a more potent and odorous pheromone) by 5α-reductase, which can subsequently be converted into 3α-androstenol or 3β-androstenol (also more potent and odorous pheromones) by 3-ketosteroid reductase.

Androstadienone is related to the androgen sex hormones; however, androstadienone does not exhibit any androgenic or anabolic effects. Though it has been reported to significantly affect the mood of heterosexual women and homosexual men, it does not alter behavior overtly, although it may have more subtle effects on attention.

Androstadienone is commonly sold in male fragrances; it is purported to increase sexual attraction. Androstadienone, in picogram quantities, has been shown to have "significant reduction of nervousness, tension and other negative feeling states" in female subjects.

== See also ==
- List of neurosteroids § Pheromones and pherines
