= Estratetraenol =

Chemical compound

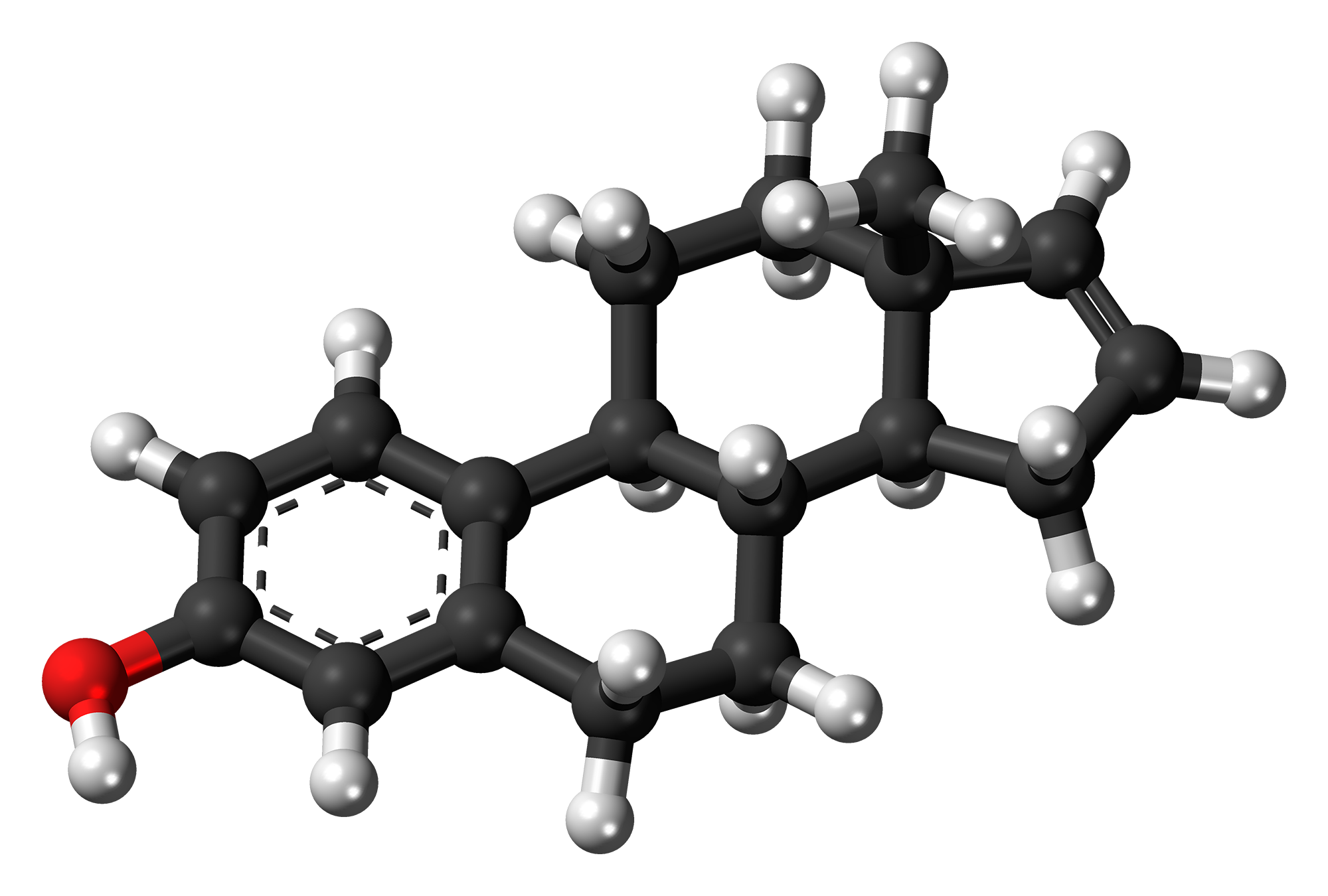

Clinical data
- Other names: Estra-1,3,5(10),16-tetraen-3-ol
- ATC code: None

Identifiers
- IUPAC name: (8S,9S,13R,14S)-13-methyl-6,7,8,9,11,12,14,15-octahydrocyclopenta[a]phenanthren-3-ol
- CAS Number: 1150-90-9
- PubChem CID: 101988
- ChemSpider: 92135
- UNII: 4QD0FTG3VT
- ChEBI: CHEBI:62849
- CompTox Dashboard (EPA): DTXSID80921587

Chemical and physical data
- Formula: C_{18}H_{22}O
- Molar mass: 254.373 g·mol^{−1}
- 3D model (JSmol): Interactive image
- SMILES: C[C@]12CC[C@H]3[C@H]([C@@H]1CC=C2)CCC4=C3C=CC(=C4)O
- InChI: InChI=1S/C18H22O/c1-18-9-2-3-17(18)16-6-4-12-11-13(19)5-7-14(12)15(16)8-10-18/h2,5,7,9,11,15-17,19H,3-4,6,8,10H2,1H3/t15-,16-,17+,18+/m1/s1; Key:CRMOMCHYBNOFIV-BDXSIMOUSA-N

Estratetraenol, also known as estra-1,3,5(10),16-tetraen-3-ol, is an endogenous steroid found in women that has been described as having pheromone-like activities in primates, including humans. Estratetraenol is synthesized from androstadienone by aromatase likely in the ovaries, and is related to the estrogen sex hormones, yet has no known estrogenic effects. It was first identified from the urine of pregnant women.

Estratetraenyl acetate, the acetate ester, is a more potent synthetic derivative of estratetraenol.

Estratetraenol is an estrane (C18) steroid and an analogue of estradiol where the C17β hydroxyl group has been removed and a double bond has been formed between the C16 and C17 positions.

== Experiments ==
Experiments performed have indicated a correlation between estratetraenol and the ability to attract cooperative mates. The hormone sends olfactory signals of high fertility in pregnant and ovulating women that presents and highlights attractive qualities in those women to potential mates. These interactions between the hormone signals and males showed an increased cooperation and compassion from males to the pregnant female.

Another study shows that the hormone can have an effect on how a male will approach the pursuance of a female by altering the level of sexual cognition and behavior. While the hormone increases the attractions of males to females, studies also show that it does not have an effect on the impulsive sexual nature of men when it relates to sexual desire and delayed gratification.

== See also ==
- List of neurosteroids § Pheromones and pherines
