= C19H28O3 =

The molecular formula C_{19}H_{28}O_{3} (molar mass: 304.43 g/mol) may refer to:

- Hydroxy-DHEA
  - 16-Hydroxydehydroepiandrosterone
  - 7α-Hydroxy-DHEA
  - 7β-Hydroxy-DHEA
  - 15α-Hydroxy-DHEA
- Hydroxytestosterone
  - 4-Hydroxytestosterone
  - 11β-Hydroxytestosterone
- 11-Ketodihydrotestosterone
- 11-Ketoandrosterone
- Methylhydroxynandrolone
