= C19H26O3 =

The molecular formula C_{19}H_{26}O_{3} may refer to:

- Bioallethrin
- Epimestrol
- Formestane
- Hydroxyandrostenedione
  - 11β-Hydroxyandrostenedione
  - 16α-Hydroxyandrostenedione
- 7-Keto-DHEA
- 11-Ketotestosterone
- Methoxyestradiols
  - 2-Methoxyestradiol
  - 4-Methoxyestradiol
  - 11β-Methoxyestradiol
- Nandrolone formate
