= 7-Hydroxy-DHEA =

7-Hydroxy-DHEA, or 7-hydroxydehydroepiandrosterone, may refer to:

- 7α-Hydroxy-DHEA
- 7β-Hydroxy-DHEA

== See also ==
- 7-Keto-DHEA
- Dehydroepiandrosterone
- 7-Hydroxyepiandrosterone
- 7α-Hydroxyepiandrosterone
- 7β-Hydroxyepiandrosterone
