= List of steroid abbreviations =

The steroid hormones are referred to by various abbreviations in the biological literature. The purpose of this list is to give commonly used abbreviations for steroid hormones, with supporting references to the literature.

== Table of abbreviations ==
Trivial Name	Abbreviation(s)	Systematic Name
Cholesterol	Chol	5-cholesten-3beta-ol
Progestogens
Pregnenolone	P5 or Preg	3beta-hydroxy-5-pregnen-20-one
17α-Hydroxypregnenolone	17-OHP5 or 17P5	3beta,17-dihydroxy-5-pregnen-20-one
Progesterone	P4 or P	4-pregnene-3,20-dione
17α-Hydroxyprogesterone	17-OHP4 or 17OHP or 17P4	17α-hydroxy-4-pregnene-3,20-dione
Allopregnanolone	ALLO	5α-pregnan-3α-ol-20-one
Androgens
Androstenedione	A4 or AE	4-androstene-3,17-dione
4-Hydroxyandrostenedione	4-OH-A	
11β-Hydroxyandrostenedione	11βOHA4 or 11βOHΔ4 or OHA	11β-Hydroxy-4-androstene-3,17-dione
Androstanediol	Adiol	3-beta,17-beta-Androstanediol
Androsterone	AN	3alpha-hydroxy-5alpha-androstan-17-one
Epiandrosterone	EPIA	3beta-hydroxy-5alpha-androstan-17-one
Adrenosterone	AT	4-androstene-3,11,17-trione
Dehydroepiandrosterone	DHEA or DHA	3beta-hydroxy-5-androsten-17-one
Dehydroepiandrosterone sulfate	DHEAS or DHAS	3beta-sulfooxy-5-androsten-17-one
Testosterone	T	17beta-hydroxy-4-androsten-3-one
Epitestosterone	epiT	17alpha-hydroxy-4-androsten-3-one
5α-Dihydrotestosterone	DHT or 5α-DHT	17beta-hydroxy-5alpha-androstan-3-one
5β-Dihydrotestosterone	5β-DHT	17beta-hydroxy-5beta-androstan-3-one
11β-Hydroxytestosterone	OHT or 11β-OHT	11beta,17beta-dihydroxy-4-androsten-3-one
11-Ketotestosterone	11-KT	17beta-hydroxy-4-androsten-3,17-dione
Estrogens
Estrone	E1	3-hydroxy-1,3,5(10)-estratrien-17-one
Estradiol	E2	1,3,5(10)-estratriene-3,17beta-diol
Estriol	E3	1,3,5(10)-estratriene-3,16alpha,17beta-triol
Corticosteroids
Corticosterone	B or CORT	11beta,21-dihydroxy-4-pregnene-3,20-dione
11-Deoxycorticosterone	DOC	21-hydroxy-4-pregnene-3,20-dione
Cortisol	F	11beta,17,21-trihydroxy-4-pregnene-3,20-dione
11-Deoxycortisol	S	17,21-dihydroxy-4-pregnene-3,20-dione
Cortisone	E	17,21-dihydroxy-4-pregnene-3,11,20-trione
18-Hydroxycorticosterone	18OHB or 18B	11beta,18,21-trihydroxy-4-pregnene-3,20-dione
1α-Hydroxycorticosterone	1α-B	1alpha,11beta, 21-trihydroxy-4-pregnene-3,20-dione
Aldosterone	A or ALDO	18,11-hemiacetal of 11beta,21-dihydroxy-3,20-dioxo-4-pregnen-18-al
