= 7-Hydroxyepiandrosterone =

7-Hydroxyepiandrosterone (7-OH-EPIA) may refer to:

- 7α-Hydroxyepiandrosterone
- 7β-Hydroxyepiandrosterone

== See also ==
- 7-Hydroxy-DHEA
- 7α-Hydroxy-DHEA
- 7β-Hydroxy-DHEA
- 7-Keto-DHEA
- Epiandrosterone
