= Hydroxydehydroepiandrosterone =

Hydroxydehydroepiandrosterone may refer to:

- 7α-Hydroxydehydroepiandrosterone
- 7β-Hydroxydehydroepiandrosterone
- 15α-Hydroxydehydroepiandrosterone
- 16α-Hydroxydehydroepiandrosterone
