= C19H30O3 =

The molecular formula C_{19}H_{30}O_{3} (molar mass: 306.446 g/mol) may refer to:

- Androstenetriol
- 11β-Hydroxydihydrotestosterone
- Hydroxyepiandrosterones
  - 7α-Hydroxyepiandrosterone
  - 7β-Hydroxyepiandrosterone
- Oxandrolone
