= 15α-Hydroxy-DHEA sulfate =

Names
- IUPAC name 15α-Hydroxy-17-oxoandrost-5-en-3β-yl hydrogen sulfate
- Systematic IUPAC name (3S,3aS,3bR,7S,9aR,9bS,11aS)-3-Hydroxy-9a,11a-dimethyl-1-oxo-2,3,3a,3b,4,6,7,8,9,9a,9b,10,11,11a-tetradecahydro-1H-cyclopenta[a]phenanthren-7-yl hydrogen sulfate
- Other names 3β,15α-Dihydroxyandrost-5-en-17-one 3β-sulfate; 15α-Hydroxydehydroepiandrosterone sulfate; 15α-Hydroxy-DHEA sulfate; 15α-OH-DHEA-S

Identifiers
3D model (JSmol)	Interactive image
- InChI: InChI=1S/C19H28O6S/c1-18-7-5-12(25-26(22,23)24)9-11(18)3-4-13-14(18)6-8-19(2)16(21)10-15(20)17(13)19/h3,12-15,17,20H,4-10H2,1-2H3,(H,22,23,24)/t12-,13+,14-,15-,17+,18-,19+/m0/s1 Key: BORVGNZEVLBZIP-CRYRVXFVSA-N
- SMILES: C[C@]12CC[C@H]3[C@@H](CC=C4C[C@H](CC[C@]34C)OS(O)(=O)=O)[C@@H]1[C@@H](O)CC2=O

Properties
Chemical formula	C_{19}H_{28}O_{6}S
Molar mass	384.49 g·mol^{−1}
- Except where otherwise noted, data are given for materials in their standard state (at 25 °C [77 °F], 100 kPa). Infobox references

15α-Hydroxydehydroepiandrosterone sulfate, abbreviated as 15α-hydroxy-DHEA sulfate or 15α-OH-DHEA-S, also known as 15α-hydroxy-17-oxoandrost-5-en-3β-yl sulfate, is an endogenous, naturally occurring steroid and a metabolic intermediate in the production of estetrol from dehydroepiandrosterone (DHEA) during pregnancy. It is the C3β sulfate ester of 15α-hydroxy-DHEA.

== See also ==
- Pregnenolone sulfate
- Dehydroepiandrosterone sulfate
- 16α-Hydroxydehydroepiandrosterone
- 16α-Hydroxyandrostenedione
- 16α-Hydroxyestrone
- Estrone sulfate
- C_{19}H_{28}O_{6}S
