= CYP23 family =

Cytochrome P450, family 23, also known as CYP23, is a nematoda cytochrome P450 monooxygenase family. The first gene identified in this family is the CYP23A1 from the Caenorhabditis elegans, is a homolog of the human gene CYP7B1.
