= Androgen =

Any steroid hormone that promotes male characteristics

- Drug class
- Testosterone, the major androgen

Class identifiers
- Synonyms: Androgenic hormone; Testoid
- Use: Hypogonadism, transgender men, performance enhancement, bodybuilding, others
- ATC code: G03B
- Biological target: Androgen receptor, mARs (e.g., GPRC6A, others)

External links
- MeSH: D000728

Legal status

An androgen (from Greek andr-, the stem of the word meaning 'man') is any natural or synthetic steroid hormone that regulates the development and maintenance of male physiological characteristics in vertebrates by binding to androgen receptors. This includes the embryological development of the primary male sex organs, and the development of male secondary sex characteristics at puberty. Androgens are synthesized in the testes, the ovaries, and the adrenal glands.

Androgens increase in both males and females during puberty. The major androgen in males is testosterone. Dihydrotestosterone (DHT) and androstenedione are of equal importance in male development. DHT in utero causes differentiation of the penis, scrotum and prostate. In adulthood, DHT contributes to balding, prostate growth, and sebaceous gland activity.

Although androgens are commonly thought of only as male sex hormones, females also have them, but at low level. Androgens are the precursors to estrogens in all humans.

In addition to their role as natural hormones, androgens are used as medications; for information on androgens as medications, see the androgen replacement therapy and anabolic steroid articles.

== Types and examples ==
The main subset of androgens, known as adrenal androgens, is composed of 19-carbon steroids synthesized in the zona reticularis, the innermost layer of the adrenal cortex. Adrenal androgens function as weak steroids (though some are precursors), and the subset includes dehydroepiandrosterone (DHEA), dehydroepiandrosterone sulfate (DHEA-S), androstenedione (A4), and androstenediol (A5).

Besides testosterone, other androgens include:

- Dehydroepiandrosterone (DHEA) is a steroid hormone produced in the adrenal cortex from cholesterol. It is the primary precursor of both the androgen and estrogen sex hormones. DHEA is also called dehydroisoandrosterone or dehydroandrosterone.
- Androstenedione (A4) is an androgenic steroid produced by the testes, adrenal cortex, and ovaries. While androstenedione is converted metabolically to testosterone and other androgens, it is also the parent structure of estrone. Use of androstenedione as an athletic or bodybuilding supplement has been banned by the International Olympic Committee, as well as other sporting organizations.
- Androstenediol (A5) is a steroid metabolite of DHEA and the precursor to sex hormones testosterone and estradiol.
- Androsterone is a chemical byproduct created during the breakdown of androgens, or derived from progesterone, that also exerts minor masculinising effects, but with one-seventh the intensity of testosterone. It is found in approximately equal amounts in the plasma and urine of both males and females.
- Dihydrotestosterone (DHT) is a metabolite of testosterone, and a more potent androgen than testosterone in that it binds more strongly to androgen receptors. It is produced in the skin and reproductive tissue.
- A4 and testosterone can also have an extra hydroxyl (-OH) or ketone (=O) group bound on position 11. In this case you can have 11-hydroxyandrostenedione, 11-ketoandrostenedione, 11-hydroxytestosterone, and 11-ketotestosterone. The latter has the same biological activity as testosterone and, therefore, these are also very important in healthy individuals and patients with diseases like, congenital adrenal hyperplasia, polycystic ovarian syndrome, or premature adrenarche.

Determined by consideration of all biological assay methods (c. 1970):

=== Female ovarian and adrenal androgens ===
The ovaries and adrenal glands also produce androgens, but at much lower levels than the testes.

== Biological function ==
=== Male prenatal development ===
==== Testes formation ====
During mammalian development, the gonads are at first capable of becoming either ovaries or testes. In humans, starting at about week 4, the gonadal rudiments are present within the intermediate mesoderm adjacent to the developing kidneys. At about week 6, epithelial sex cords develop within the forming testes and incorporate the germ cells as they migrate into the gonads. In males, certain Y chromosome genes, particularly SRY, control development of the male phenotype, including conversion of the early bipotential gonad into testes. In males, the sex cords fully invade the developing gonads.

==== Androgen production ====
The mesoderm-derived epithelial cells of the sex cords in developing testes become the Sertoli cells, which will function to support sperm cell formation. A minor population of nonepithelial cells appear between the tubules by week 8 of human fetal development. These are Leydig cells. Soon after they differentiate, Leydig cells begin to produce androgens.

==== Androgen effects ====
The androgens function as paracrine hormones required by the Sertoli cells to support sperm production. They are also required for the masculinization of the developing male fetus (including penis and scrotum formation). Under the influence of androgens, remnants of the mesonephron, the Wolffian ducts, develop into the epididymis, vas deferens and seminal vesicles. This action of androgens is supported by a hormone from Sertoli cells, Müllerian inhibitory hormone (MIH), which prevents the embryonic Müllerian ducts from developing into fallopian tubes and other female reproductive tract tissues in male embryos. MIH and androgens cooperate to allow for movement of testes into the scrotum.

==== Early regulation ====
Before the production of the pituitary hormone luteinizing hormone (LH) by the embryo starting at about weeks 11–12, human chorionic gonadotrophin (hCG) promotes the differentiation of Leydig cells and their production of androgens at week 8. Androgen action in target tissues often involves conversion of testosterone to 5α-dihydrotestosterone (DHT).

=== Male pubertal development ===
At the time of puberty, androgen levels increase dramatically in males, and androgens mediate the development of masculine secondary sexual characteristics as well as the activation of spermatogenesis and fertility and masculine behavioral changes such as increased sex drive. Masculine secondary sexual characteristics include androgenic hair, voice deepening, emergence of the Adam's apple, broadening of the shoulders, increased muscle mass, and penile growth.

=== Spermatogenesis ===
During puberty, androgen, LH and follicle stimulating hormone (FSH) production increase and the sex cords hollow out, forming the seminiferous tubules, and the germ cells start to differentiate into sperm. Throughout adulthood, androgens and FSH cooperatively act on Sertoli cells in the testes to support sperm production. Exogenous androgen supplements can be used as a male contraceptive. Elevated androgen levels caused by use of androgen supplements can inhibit production of LH and block production of endogenous androgens by Leydig cells. Without the locally high levels of androgens in testes due to androgen production by Leydig cells, the seminiferous tubules can degenerate, resulting in infertility. For this reason, many transdermal androgen patches are applied to the scrotum.

=== Fat deposition ===
Males typically have less body fat than females. Recent results indicate androgens inhibit the ability of some fat cells to store lipids by blocking a signal transduction pathway that normally supports adipocyte function. Also, androgens, but not estrogens, increase beta adrenergic receptors while decreasing alpha adrenergic receptors—which results in increased levels of epinephrine/norepinephrine due to lack of alpha-2 receptor negative feedback and decreased fat accumulation due to epinephrine/norepinephrine then acting on lipolysis-inducing beta receptors.

=== Muscle mass ===
Males typically have more skeletal muscle mass than females. Androgens promote the enlargement of skeletal muscle cells in a coordinated manner by acting on several cell types in skeletal muscle tissue. One cell type, called the myoblast, conveys androgen receptors for generating muscle. Fusion of myoblasts generates myotubes, in a process linked to androgen receptor levels. Higher androgen levels lead to increased expression of androgen receptor.

=== Brain ===
Circulating levels of androgens can influence human behavior because some neurons are sensitive to steroid hormones. Androgen levels have been implicated in the regulation of human aggression and libido. Indeed, androgens are capable of altering the structure of the brain in several species, including mice, rats, and primates, producing sex differences. More recent studies showing the general mood of transgender men, who have undergone transgender hormone replacement therapy replacing estrogens with androgens, do not show any substantial long-term behavioral changes.

Numerous reports have shown androgens alone are capable of altering the structure of the brain, but identification of which alterations in neuroanatomy stem from androgens or estrogens is difficult, because of their potential for conversion.

Evidence from neurogenesis (formation of new neurons) studies on male rats has shown that the hippocampus is a useful brain region to examine when determining the effects of androgens on behavior. To examine neurogenesis, wild-type male rats were compared with male rats that had androgen insensitivity syndrome, a genetic difference resulting in complete or partial insensitivity to androgens and a lack of external male genitalia.

Neural injections of bromodeoxyuridine (BrdU) were applied to males of both groups to test for neurogenesis. Analysis showed that testosterone and dihydrotestosterone regulated adult hippocampal neurogenesis (AHN). Adult hippocampal neurogenesis was regulated through the androgen receptor in the wild-type male rats, but not in the TMF male rats. To further test the role of activated androgen receptors on AHN, flutamide, an antiandrogen drug that competes with testosterone and dihydrotestosterone for androgen receptors, and dihydrotestosterone were administered to normal male rats. Dihydrotestosterone increased the number of BrdU cells, while flutamide inhibited these cells. Moreover, estrogens had no effect. This research demonstrates how androgens can increase AHN.

Researchers also examined how mild exercise affected androgen synthesis which in turn causes AHN activation of N-methyl-D-aspartate (NMDA) receptors. NMDA induces a calcium flux that allows for synaptic plasticity which is crucial for AHN.

Researchers injected both orchidectomized (ORX) (castrated) and sham castrated male rats with BrdU to determine if the number of new cells was increased. They found that AHN in male rats is increased with mild exercise by boosting synthesis of dihydrotestosterone in the hippocampus. Again it was noted that AHN was not increased via activation of the estrogen receptors.

Androgen regulation decreases the likelihood of depression in males. In preadolescent male rats, neonatal rats treated with flutamide developed more depression-like symptoms compared to control rats.

Again BrdU was injected into both groups of rats in order to see if cells were multiplying in the living tissue. These results demonstrate how the organization of androgens has a positive effect on preadolescent hippocampal neurogenesis that may be linked with lower depression-like symptoms.

Social isolation has a hindering effect in AHN whereas normal regulation of androgens increases AHN. A study using male rats showed that testosterone may block social isolation, which results in hippocampal neurogenesis reaching homeostasis—regulation that keeps internal conditions stable. A Brdu analysis showed that excess testosterone did not increase this blocking effect against social isolation; that is, the natural circulating levels of androgens cancel out the negative effects of social isolation on AHN.

=== Female-specific effects ===
Androgens have potential roles in relaxation of the myometrium via non-genomic, androgen receptor-independent pathways, preventing premature uterine contractions in pregnancy.

=== Androgen insensitivity ===
Reduced ability of an XY-karyotype fetus to respond to androgens can result in one of several conditions, including infertility and several forms of intersex conditions.

=== Miscellaneous ===
Yolk androgen levels in certain birds have been positively correlated to social dominance later in life. See American coot.

== Biological activity ==
Androgens bind to and activate androgen receptors (ARs) to mediate most of their biological effects.

=== Relative potency ===
The reported relative potency varies from source to source. The following table is based on (recombinant rat) androgen receptor affinities. Some weak androgens can be converted to more potent androgens in the body, in particular testosterone and DHT, so they may have additional indirect potency when taken as a drug.

Androgen	Potency Relative to Metribolone
5α-Dihydrotestosterone (DHT)	140%
Testosterone	19%
Androstenedione	0.24%
Androstenediol	0.22%
Dehydroepiandrosterone	0.010%
Androsterone	0.0076%

5α-Dihydrotestosterone (DHT) was 2.4 times more potent than testosterone at maintaining normal prostate weight and duct lumen mass (this is a measure of epithelial cell function stimulation). Whereas DHT was equally potent as testosterone at preventing prostate cell death after castration. One of the 11-oxygenated androgens, namely 11-ketotestosterone, has the same potency as testosterone.

=== Non-genomic actions ===
Androgens have also been found to signal through membrane androgen receptors, which are distinct from the classical nuclear androgen receptor.

== Biochemistry ==
Steroidogenesis, showing the relation between several androgens, is at bottom left. Estrone and estradiol, in contrast, are estrogens.

=== Biosynthesis ===
Androgens are synthesized from cholesterol and are produced primarily in the gonads (testicles and ovaries) and also in the adrenal glands. The testicles produce a much higher quantity than the ovaries. Conversion of testosterone to the more potent DHT occurs in prostate gland, liver, brain and skin.

Production rates, secretion rates, clearance rates, and blood levels of major sex hormones
Sex	Sex hormone	Reproductive phase	Blood production rate	Gonadal secretion rate	Metabolic clearance rate	Reference range (serum levels)	
Sex	Sex hormone	Reproductive phase	Blood production rate	Gonadal secretion rate	Metabolic clearance rate	Molar concentration	Mass concentration
Men	Androstenedione	–	2.8 mg/day	1.6 mg/day	2200 L/day	2.8–7.3 nmol/L	80–210 ng/dL
Men	Testosterone	–	6.5 mg/day	6.2 mg/day	950 L/day	6.9–34.7 nmol/L	200–1000 ng/dL
Men	Estrone	–	150 μg/day	110 μg/day	2050 L/day	37–250 pmol/L	10–70 pg/mL
Men	Estradiol	–	60 μg/day	50 μg/day	1600 L/day	<37–210 pmol/L	10–57 pg/mL
Men	Estrone sulfate	–	80 μg/day	Insignificant	167 L/day	600–2500 pmol/L	200–900 pg/mL
Women	Androstenedione	–	3.2 mg/day	2.8 mg/day	2000 L/day	3.1–12.2 nmol/L	89–350 ng/dL
Women	Testosterone	–	190 μg/day	60 μg/day	500 L/day	0.7–2.8 nmol/L	20–81 ng/dL
Women	Estrone	Follicular phase	110 μg/day	80 μg/day	2200 L/day	110–400 pmol/L	30–110 pg/mL
Women	Estrone	Luteal phase	260 μg/day	150 μg/day	2200 L/day	310–660 pmol/L	80–180 pg/mL
Women	Estrone	Postmenopause	40 μg/day	Insignificant	1610 L/day	22–230 pmol/L	6–60 pg/mL
Women	Estradiol	Follicular phase	90 μg/day	80 μg/day	1200 L/day	<37–360 pmol/L	10–98 pg/mL
Women	Estradiol	Luteal phase	250 μg/day	240 μg/day	1200 L/day	699–1250 pmol/L	190–341 pg/mL
Women	Estradiol	Postmenopause	6 μg/day	Insignificant	910 L/day	<37–140 pmol/L	10–38 pg/mL
Women	Estrone sulfate	Follicular phase	100 μg/day	Insignificant	146 L/day	700–3600 pmol/L	250–1300 pg/mL
Women	Estrone sulfate	Luteal phase	180 μg/day	Insignificant	146 L/day	1100–7300 pmol/L	400–2600 pg/mL
Women	Progesterone	Follicular phase	2 mg/day	1.7 mg/day	2100 L/day	0.3–3 nmol/L	0.1–0.9 ng/mL
Women	Progesterone	Luteal phase	25 mg/day	24 mg/day	2100 L/day	19–45 nmol/L	6–14 ng/mL
Notes and sources Notes: "The concentration of a steroid in the circulation is determined by the rate at which it is secreted from glands, the rate of metabolism of precursor or prehormones into the steroid, and the rate at which it is extracted by tissues and metabolized. The secretion rate of a steroid refers to the total secretion of the compound from a gland per unit time. Secretion rates have been assessed by sampling the venous effluent from a gland over time and subtracting out the arterial and peripheral venous hormone concentration. The metabolic clearance rate of a steroid is defined as the volume of blood that has been completely cleared of the hormone per unit time. The production rate of a steroid hormone refers to entry into the blood of the compound from all possible sources, including secretion from glands and conversion of prohormones into the steroid of interest. At steady state, the amount of hormone entering the blood from all sources will be equal to the rate at which it is being cleared (metabolic clearance rate) multiplied by blood concentration (production rate = metabolic clearance rate × concentration). If there is little contribution of prohormone metabolism to the circulating pool of steroid, then the production rate will approximate the secretion rate." Sources: See template.

=== Metabolism ===
Androgens are metabolized mainly in the liver.

== Medical uses ==
A low testosterone level (hypogonadism) in men may be treated with testosterone administration. Prostate cancer may be treated by removing the major source of testosterone: testicle removal (orchiectomy); or agents which block androgens from accessing their receptor: antiandrogens.

== See also ==
- Androgen insensitivity syndrome
- Androgen insufficiency syndrome
- Andrology
- Endocrine system
- Exercise and androgen levels
- List of androgens/anabolic steroids
- List of androgens/anabolic steroids available in the United States
- List of steroid abbreviations
- Testosterone and the cardiovascular system
