= Exercise and androgen levels =

Steroid hormone relationship with exercise

Physical exercise has been found to be associated with changes in androgen levels. In cross-sectional analyses, aerobic exercisers have lower basal total and free testosterone compared to the sedentary. Anaerobic exercisers also have lower testosterone compared to the sedentary but a slight increase in basal testosterone with resistance training over time. There is some correlation between testosterone and physical activity in the middle aged and elderly. Acutely, testosterone briefly increases when comparing aerobic, anaerobic and mixed forms of exercise. A study assessed men who were resistance trained, endurance trained, or sedentary in which they either rested, ran or did a resistance session. Androgens increased in response to exercise, particularly resistance, while cortisol only increased with resistance. DHEA increased with resistance exercise and remained elevated during recovery in resistance-trained subjects. After initial post-exercise increase, there was decline in free and total testosterone during resistance recovery, particularly in resistance-trained subjects. Endurance-trained subjects showed less change in hormone levels in response to exercise than resistance-trained subjects. Another study found relative short term effects of aerobic, anaerobic and combined anaerobic-aerobic exercise protocols on hormone levels did not change. The study noted increases in testosterone and cortisol immediately after exercise, which in 2 hours returned to baseline levels.

== Aerobic ==
In trained long term aerobic exercisers, basal levels are unchanged, or decreased. Acutely, endurance based aerobic efforts cause testosterone to rise.

A year long, moderate-intensity aerobic exercise program increased DHT and SHBG in sedentary men age 40–75, but had no effect on other androgens. Both DHT and SHBG increased 14% in exercisers at 3 months, and at 12 months they remained 9% above baseline. SHBG is protective against DHT as it binds free androgen. In acute assessment of hormone levels in soccer players before, during and after a game, DHT and testosterone increased during the match, but returned to baseline after 45 minutes rest. Aerobic exercise in Japanese rats done on a rodent treadmill doubled local concentrations of DHT in calf muscles as assessed by protein assay. After intense aerobic effort, high endurance athletes were also found to have lower free testosterone the next day. In prolonged endurance exercise, such as a marathon, levels ultimately decrease. Similarly, DHT drops, while adrenal androgen and cortisol will increase with the stress response.

== Anaerobic ==
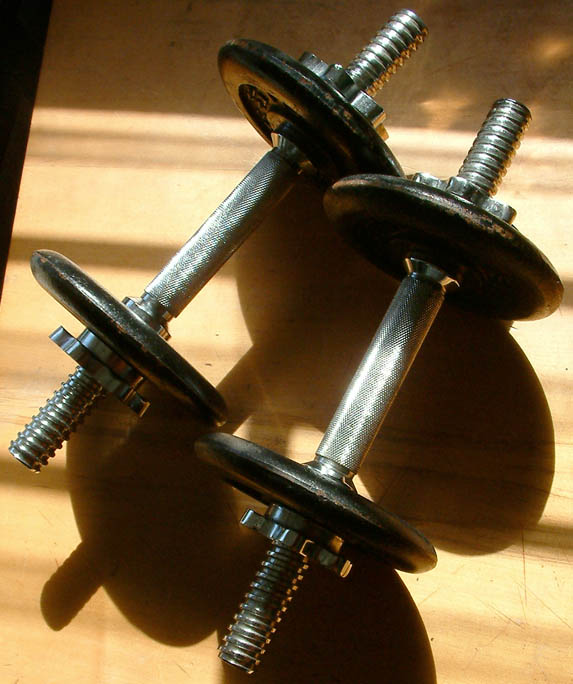
Effects of anaerobic exercise also vary with length of time.

It is unknown if anaerobic training changes individual hormone profiles, or if conditioned athletes in studies self-selected because of physiologic predisposition to athletic conditioning. There is variation of response to anaerobic stress depending on exercise intensity, age, gender, length of time studied, and time at which serum indices were drawn. Most studies report that testosterone increases or is unchanged acutely, though some even report it to decrease. Anaerobic exercisers have testosterone levels below sedentary controls in cross sectional analysis. Over months to years, levels are stable to slightly increased.

The ratio of testosterone to cortisol can both increase and decrease during resistance training, depending on intensity of exercise. A study comparing young and old subjects showed acute increases in GH and testosterone for both, although the latter increased less in older men. Testosterone rises in late hours of sleep after anaerobic exercise. Skeletal muscle androgen receptor expression increases with acute exercise in correlation to free testosterone. When comparing men and women in the 30-, 50-, and 70-year age groups, young and middle aged men showed increased testosterone after exercise, with the latter also having increased cortisol. Elderly men showed no change. Other studies have also shown with age there is a downtrend of testosterone and attenuated growth hormone response. Young men have shown no acute change in testosterone with resistance training, with increase in cortisol and growth hormone depending on intensity. One study in young men showed testosterone acutely stable, with increase in GH and IGF-1. Similarly, a study showed testosterone did not increase in young men, women, and pubescent boys unaccustomed to weight training when corrected for plasma volume. Extreme intensity of strength training may trigger the stress response, resulting in lower testosterone levels, an effect accentuated by energy deprivation.

A separate study comparing different ages, however, found no difference in acute testosterone and cortisol levels between groups, but attenuated growth hormone response in the elderly. Acutely, other studies have shown testosterone to increase. In a small group of anaerobically trained athletes, stressful training acutely even decreased serum testosterone and its ratio to cortisol and SHBG, with an increase in LH. With subsequent decompensation, testosterone was stable, but cortisol and SHBG decreased. Another case control showed with intense training followed by rest, testosterone dropped and LH increased initially.

Interval and quality of exercise also affect hormonal response. Sessions of moderate to high intensity with multiple sets and short time intervals, during which energy is derived from glycolytic lactate metabolism, appear to be the greatest stimulus for steroid hormone response. Hormonal response in young men varies with the number of sets in the exercise session. However, when the number increased from 4 to 6, anabolic levels stabilized and cortisol continued to rise, suggesting that alterations in anaerobic volume could alter anabolic and catabolic hormonal balance. When sets are performed at maximum repetitions, interval has no influence at a certain intensity range, with no acute hormone response difference between protocols at 10 maximum reps with 2- and 5-minute intervals. There is a higher total testosterone response in hypertrophy protocols compared to those for strength and power, despite equalization of total work load (defined as load x sets x repetitions). There is a 27% greater testosterone response using protocols with simultaneous use of all four limbs. Androgenic response was also noted in protocols using upper and lower limbs separately to a lesser degree.

A number of studies have looked at effects of anaerobic exercise over months to years, showing it to be constant or slightly increased. A small case-control of anaerobic training in young untrained males over six weeks found decline in free testosterone of 17 percent. With men in their 60s, resistive training over 16 weeks did not affect baseline anabolic hormone levels, although GH increased acutely with exercise. A study over 21 weeks in male strength athletes showed basal hormone levels to be constant, despite strength increase. A follow up study looked at a larger group of weight trainers over 24 weeks, with 12-week decompensation. Training caused no change in total testosterone, but there were decreases in free testosterone, progesterone, androstendione, DHEA, cortisol, transcortin, and in the cortisol:CBG ratio, suggesting androgen turnover increased with training intensity, without change in total testosterone. A study looking at young men and resistance training over 48 weeks found increases in baseline serum testosterone from 20 ± 5 to 25 ± 5 nmol/L, and an increase in testosterone:SHBG ratio, LH and FSH.

== Combined training ==
One study showed GH increase with anaerobic effort to be blunted in those who performed aerobic training for 60 minutes prior to strength training. Testosterone levels remained high only at the end of the training session with aerobic training followed by strength training, a phenomenon not seen with weight training done before aerobics. In an 11-week soccer training program focusing on combined vertical jumps, short sprints, and submaximal endurance running, total testosterone increased, but SHBG rose in parallel, maintaining a constant free androgen index.
