= 11β-Hydroxydihydrotestosterone =

Names
- IUPAC name 11β,17β-dihydroxy-5α-androstan-3-one
- Systematic IUPAC name (5S,8S,9S,10S,11S,13S,14S,17S)-11,17-dihydroxy-10,13-dimethyl-1,2,4,5,6,7,8,9,11,12,14,15,16,17-tetradecahydrocyclopenta[a]phenanthren-3-one
- Other names 5α-androstan-11β,17β-diol-3-one

Identifiers
CAS Number	7801-30-1
3D model (JSmol)	Interactive image
ChemSpider	8193624
PubChem CID	10018051
- InChI: InChI=1S/C19H30O3/c1-18-8-7-12(20)9-11(18)3-4-13-14-5-6-16(22)19(14,2)10-15(21)17(13)18/h11,13-17,21-22H,3-10H2,1-2H3/t11-,13-,14-,15-,16-,17+,18-,19-/m0/s1
- SMILES: C1CC(=O)C[C@]2([H])CC[C@@]3([H])[C@]4([H])CC[C@H](O)[C@@]4(C)C[C@H](O)[C@]3([H])[C@@]12C

Properties
Chemical formula	C_{19}H_{30}O_{3}
Molar mass	306.446 g·mol^{−1}

Hazards
- GHS labelling
Pictograms	(GHS08: Health hazard)
Signal word	Danger
Hazard statements	H351, H360
Precautionary statements	P201, P202, P281, P308+P313, P405, P501
- Except where otherwise noted, data are given for materials in their standard state (at 25 °C [77 °F], 100 kPa). Infobox references

11β-Hydroxydihydrotestosterone (11OHDHT) is an endogenous steroid. Although it may not have significant androgenic activity, it may still be an important precursor to androgenic molecules.

== Biological role ==
11OHDHT, along with other carbon-11-oxygenated (C11-oxy) steroids, 11-ketodihydrotestosterone (11KDHT) and 11-ketotestosterone (11KT), are androgen receptor (AR) agonists. The interconversion of C11-oxy C19 steroids, which includes 11OHDHT, was found to be more efficient than that of C11-oxy C21 steroids. 11OHDHT was also found to exhibit antagonism towards the progesterone receptor B (PRB), although it is not a pregnane (C21) steroid, highlighting the complex relationship between receptors and active as well as "inactive" C11-oxy steroids.

== See also ==
- Dihydrotestosterone
- Steroid 11β-hydroxylase
- 11-Ketodihydrotestosterone
- 11β-Hydroxytestosterone
