= Hydroxyandrostenedione =

Hydroxyandrostenedione may refer to:

- 11β-Hydroxyandrostenedione
- 16α-Hydroxyandrostenedione
