= Hydroxyepiandrosterone =

Hydroxyepiandrosterone may refer to:

- 7α-Hydroxyepiandrosterone
- 7β-Hydroxyepiandrosterone
