= 16α-Hydroxy-DHEA sulfate =

Names
- IUPAC name 16α-Hydroxy-17-oxoandrost-5-en-3β-yl hydrogen sulfate
- Systematic IUPAC name (2R,3aS,3bR,7S,9aR,9bS,11aS)-2-Hydroxy-9a,11a-dimethyl-1-oxo-2,3,3a,3b,4,6,7,8,9,9a,9b,10,11,11a-tetradecahydro-1H-cyclopenta[a]phenanthren-7-yl hydrogen sulfate
- Other names 16α-Hydroxy-17-oxoandrost-5-en-3β-yl sulfate; 16α-OH-DHEA-S

Identifiers
CAS Number	4873-65-8
3D model (JSmol)	Interactive image
ChEBI	CHEBI:87538
ChemSpider	24850136
PubChem CID	20848950
CompTox Dashboard (EPA)	DTXSID901033144
- InChI: InChI=1S/C19H28O6S/c1-18-7-5-12(25-26(22,23)24)9-11(18)3-4-13-14(18)6-8-19(2)15(13)10-16(20)17(19)21/h3,12-16,20H,4-10H2,1-2H3,(H,22,23,24)/t12-,13+,14-,15-,16+,18-,19-/m0/s1 Key: ALBNSVAJDFJRKQ-DNKQKWOHSA-N
- SMILES: C[C@]12CC[C@@H](CC1=CC[C@@H]3[C@@H]2CC[C@]4([C@H]3C[C@H](C4=O)O)C)OS(=O)(=O)O

Properties
Chemical formula	C_{19}H_{28}O_{6}S
Molar mass	384.49 g·mol^{−1}
- Except where otherwise noted, data are given for materials in their standard state (at 25 °C [77 °F], 100 kPa). Infobox references

16α-Hydroxydehydroepiandrosterone sulfate (16α-OH-DHEA-S), also known as 16α-hydroxy-17-oxoandrost-5-en-3β-yl sulfate, is an endogenous, naturally occurring steroid and a metabolic intermediate in the production of estriol from dehydroepiandrosterone (DHEA) during pregnancy. It is the C3β sulfate ester of 16α-hydroxy-DHEA.

== See also ==
- Pregnenolone sulfate
- Dehydroepiandrosterone sulfate
- 15α-Hydroxy-DHEA sulfate
- 16α-Hydroxyandrostenedione
- 16α-Hydroxyestrone
- Estrone sulfate
