= 25-hydroxycholesterol 7α-hydroxylase =

Class of enzymes

25-hydroxycholesterol 7alpha-hydroxylase

Identifiers
- EC no.: 1.14.13.100

Databases
- IntEnz: IntEnz view
- BRENDA: BRENDA entry
- ExPASy: NiceZyme view
- KEGG: KEGG entry
- MetaCyc: metabolic pathway
- PRIAM: profile
- PDB structures: RCSB PDB PDBe PDBsum
Search
- PMC: articles
- PubMed: articles
- NCBI: proteins

25-hydroxycholesterol 7alpha-hydroxylase (EC 1.14.13.100, 25-hydroxycholesterol 7alpha-monooxygenase, CYP7B1, CYP7B1 oxysterol 7alpha-hydroxylase) is an enzyme with systematic name cholest-5-ene-3beta,25-diol,NADPH:oxygen oxidoreductase (7alpha-hydroxylating). This enzyme catalyses the following chemical reaction

(1) cholest-5-ene-3beta,25-diol + NADPH + H^{+} + O_{2} $\rightleftharpoons$ cholest-5-ene-3beta,7alpha,25-triol + NADP^{+} + H_{2}O
(2) cholest-5-ene-3beta,27-diol + NADPH + H^{+} + O_{2} $\rightleftharpoons$ cholest-5-ene-3beta,7alpha,27-triol + NADP^{+} + H_{2}O

25-hydroxycholesterol 7α-hydroxylase is a heme-thiolate protein (P-450).

== See also ==
- cholesterol;
- 25-hydroxycholesterol.
