= C19H28O6S =

The molecular formula C_{19}H_{28}O_{6}S (molar mass: 384.487 g/mol, exact mass: 384.1607 u) may refer to:

- 15α-Hydroxy-DHEA sulfate
- 16α-Hydroxy-DHEA sulfate
