= 11-Ketoandrosterone =

Names
- IUPAC name 3α-Hydroxy-5α-androstane-11,17-dione
- Systematic IUPAC name (3aS,3bS,5aS,7R,9aS,9bS,11aS)-7-Hydroxy-9a,11a-dimethyltetradecahydro-1H-cyclopenta[a]phenanthrene-1,10(2H)-dione
- Other names 11-Oxoandrosterone

Identifiers
CAS Number	1231-82-9
3D model (JSmol)	Interactive image
ChEBI	CHEBI:34134
ChemSpider	92167
KEGG	C14671
PubChem CID	102029
UNII	3T4E87JT27
CompTox Dashboard (EPA)	DTXSID901043038
- InChI: InChI=1S/C19H28O3/c1-18-8-7-12(20)9-11(18)3-4-13-14-5-6-16(22)19(14,2)10-15(21)17(13)18/h11-14,17,20H,3-10H2,1-2H3/t11-,12+,13-,14-,17+,18-,19-/m0/s1
- SMILES: C[C@]12CC(=O)[C@H]3[C@@H](CC[C@H]4C[C@H](O)CC[C@]34C)[C@@H]1CCC2=O

Properties
Chemical formula	C_{19}H_{28}O_{3}
Molar mass	304.430 g·mol^{−1}
- Except where otherwise noted, data are given for materials in their standard state (at 25 °C [77 °F], 100 kPa). Infobox references

11-Ketoandrosterone is an endogenous steroid.

== Function ==
11-Ketoandrosterone is an androgen. Androgens are sex hormones that stimulate or control the development and maintenance of male characteristics in vertebrates by binding to androgen receptors. However, the potency of 11-ketoandrosterone as an agonist of androgen receptors was not known as of 2020.

== Structure ==
11-Ketoandrosterone is a 11-keto form and a metabolite of androsterone.

11-Ketoandrosterone belongs to a group of 11-oxyandrogens, i.e. 11-oxygenated (oxygen atom on C11 position forms a ketone group) 19-carbon steroids. 11-oxyandrogens are potent and clinically relevant agonists of the androgen receptors. Potency of 11-ketotestosterone, an 11-oxyandrogen, is similar to that of testosterone. 11-ketotestosterone, derived from 11β-hydroxyandrostenedione, may be the main androgen for healthy women.

== Clinical relevance ==
11-Ketoandrosterone is a metabolite that may be biosynthesized within the androgen backdoor pathway, a metabolic pathway for androgen synthesis that bypasses testosterone as an intermediate product.

SRD5A2 catalyzes the 5α-reduction of 11-ketotestosterone that terminates at 11-ketoandrosterone, but only causes a small amount of 11-ketotestosterone inactivation. However, since the metabolism of the glucocorticoid cortisol also produces 11-ketoandrosterone, 11-ketoandrosterone may be considered as a more specific urinary marker for the production of 11-ketotestosterone.

== See also ==
- Androgen backdoor pathway
- Androsterone
