= 11-Ketodihydrotestosterone =

Organic chemical compound

Names
- IUPAC name 17β-Hydroxy-5α-androstane-3,11-dione
- Systematic IUPAC name (1S,3aS,3bS,5aS,9aS,9bS,11aS)-1-Hydroxy-9a,11a-dimethyltetradecahydro-1H-cyclopenta[a]phenanthrene-7,10-dione
- Other names 11-Oxodihydrotestosterone; 5α-Androstan-17β-ol-3,11-dione; 11-KDHT

Identifiers
CAS Number	32694-37-4
3D model (JSmol)	Interactive image
ChemSpider	9372548
PubChem CID	11197479
UNII	DX994972WA
CompTox Dashboard (EPA)	DTXSID201043344
- InChI: InChI=1S/C19H28O3/c1-18-8-7-12(20)9-11(18)3-4-13-14-5-6-16(22)19(14,2)10-15(21)17(13)18/h11,13-14,16-17,22H,3-10H2,1-2H3/t11-,13-,14-,16-,17+,18-,19-/m0/s1 Key: RSQKILYTRHKUIJ-HZGXJFKTSA-N
- SMILES: C[C@]12CCC(=O)C[C@@H]1CC[C@@H]3[C@@H]2C(=O)C[C@]4([C@H]3CC[C@@H]4O)C

Properties
Chemical formula	C_{19}H_{28}O_{3}
Molar mass	304.43 g/mol
- Except where otherwise noted, data are given for materials in their standard state (at 25 °C [77 °F], 100 kPa). Infobox references

11-Ketodihydrotestosterone (11-KDHT), also known as 5α-androstan-17β-ol-3,11-dione, is an endogenous, naturally occurring steroid and androgen prohormone that is produced primarily, if not exclusively, in the adrenal glands. It is closely related to 11β-hydroxyandrostenedione (11β-KA4), adrenosterone (11-ketoandrostenedione; 11-KA4), and 11-ketotestosterone (11-KT), which are also produced in the adrenal glands.

== See also ==
- Dihydrotestosterone
- 11β-Hydroxydihydrotestosterone
