= 4-Dehydroepiandrosterone =

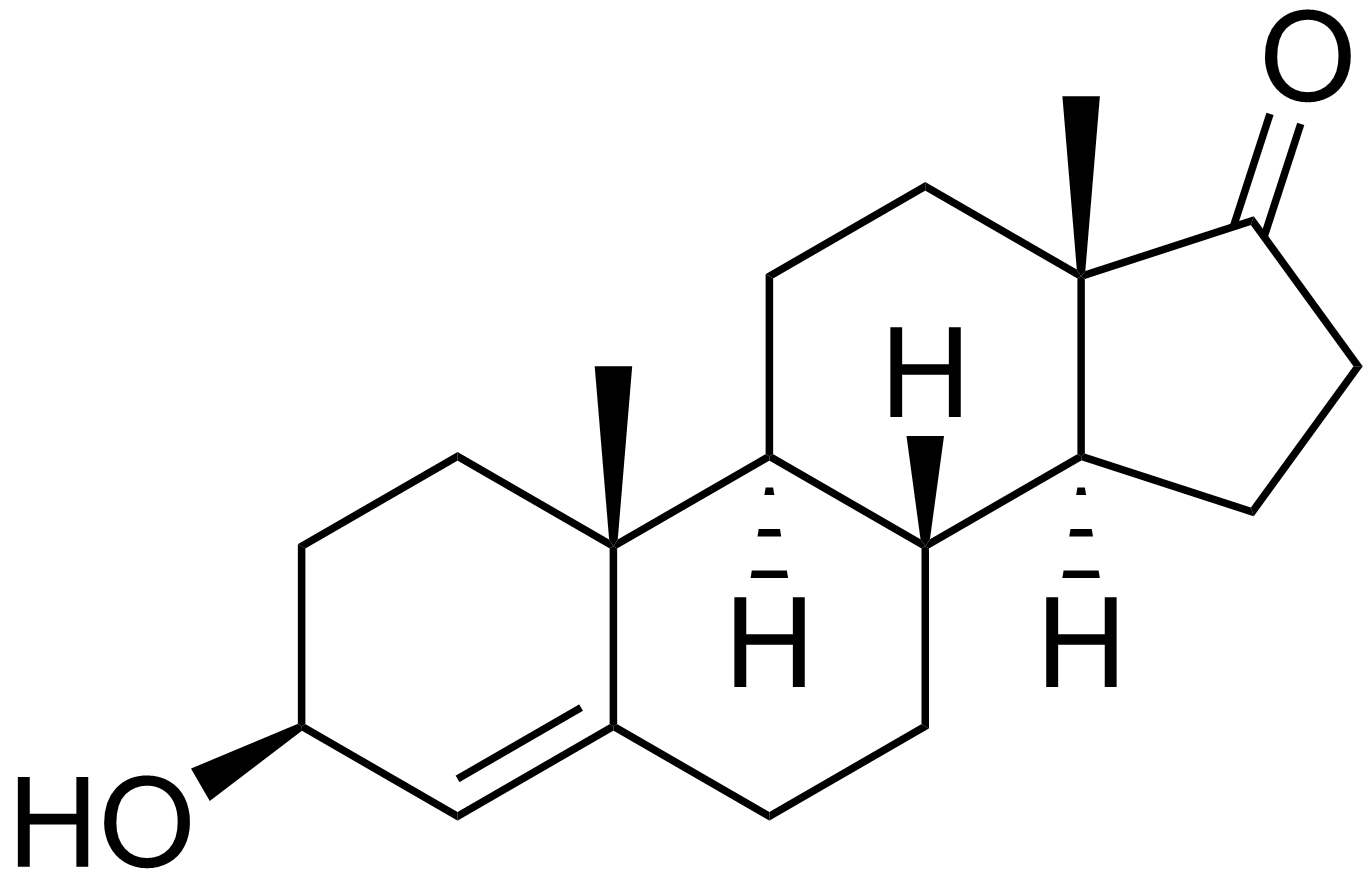

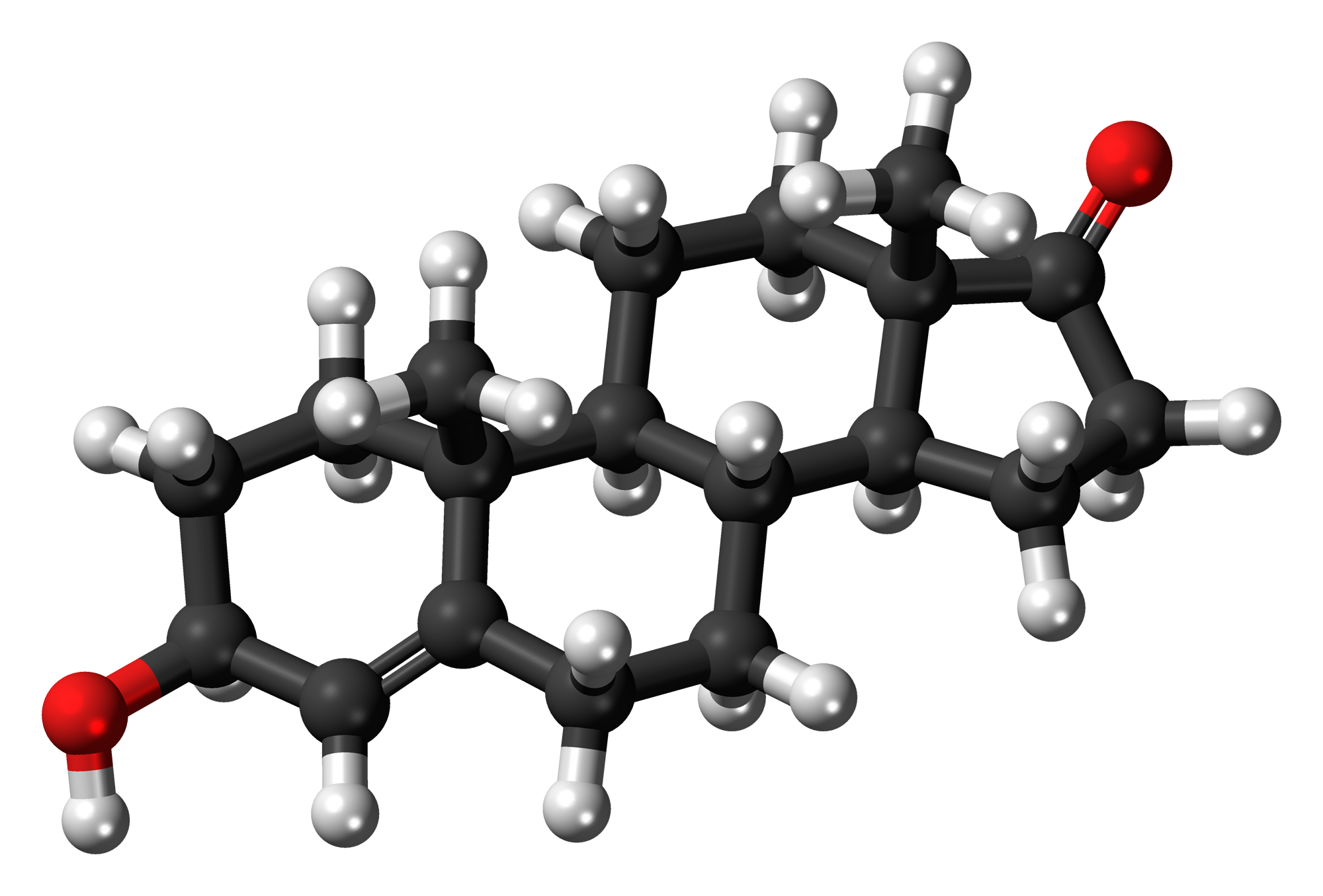

Names
- IUPAC name 3β-Hydroxyandrost-4-en-17-one
- Systematic IUPAC name (3aS,3bR,7S,9aR,9bS,11aS)-7-Hydroxy-9a,11a-dimethyl-2,3,3a,3b,4,5,7,8,9,9a,9b,10,11,11a-tetradecahydro-1H-cyclopenta[a]phenanthren-1-one
- Other names Androst-4-en-3β-ol-17-one

Identifiers
| CAS Number | 571-44-8 |
| 3D model (JSmol) | Interactive image; Interactive image |
| ChEMBL | ChEMBL1077603 |
| ChemSpider | 8123501 |
| PubChem CID | 9947889 |
| UNII | 8U3PGO66GQ |
| CompTox Dashboard (EPA) | DTXSID50433223 |
- InChI: InChI=1S/C19H28O2/c1-18-9-7-13(20)11-12(18)3-4-14-15-5-6-17(21)19(15,2)10-8-16(14)18/h11,13-16,20H,3-10H2,1-2H3/t13-,14-,15-,16-,18-,19-/m0/s1 Key: VMYTXBKVYDESSJ-USOAJAOKSA-N
- SMILES: O=C1CC[C@@]2([H])[C@]3([H])CCC4=C[C@@H](O)CC[C@]4(C)[C@@]3([H])CC[C@@]21C; O=C4[C@]3(CC[C@@H]2[C@@]1(C(=C/[C@@H](O)CC1)\CC[C@H]2[C@@H]3CC4)C)C

Properties
| Chemical formula | C_{19}H_{28}O_{2} |
| Molar mass | 288.431 g·mol^{−1} |
- Except where otherwise noted, data are given for materials in their standard state (at 25 °C [77 °F], 100 kPa). verify (what is ?) Infobox references

4-Dehydroepiandrosterone (4-DHEA) or 4-Andro is a steroid that is an isomer of 5-dehydroepiandrosterone.

4-DHEA has been prepared by laboratory synthesis.

== Synonyms ==
Synonyms for 4-dehydroepiandrosterone are:

3β-Hydroxy-4-androsten-17-one, 3β-hydroxyandrost-4-en-17-one, 3β-hydroxy-D4-androsten-17-one, 3β-hydroxyandrost-4-en-17-one, 3β-hydroxy-etioallocholan-4-en-17-one, and 4-androsten-3β-ol-17-one.

== See also ==
- 1-Dehydroepiandrosterone
- 5-Dehydroepiandrosterone
