= Methoxyestradiol =

Methoxyestradiol may refer to:

- 2-Methoxyestradiol
- 4-Methoxyestradiol
- 11β-Methoxyestradiol
