= 15α-Hydroxy-DHEA =

Names
- IUPAC name 3β,15α-Dihydroxyandrost-5-en-17-one
- Systematic IUPAC name (3S,3aS,3bR,7S,9aR,9bS,11aS)-3,7-Dihydroxy-9a,11a-dimethyl-2,3,3a,3b,4,6,7,8,9,9a,9b,10,11,11a-tetradecahydro-1H-cyclopenta[a]phenanthren-1-one
- Other names 15α-Hydroxydehydroepiandrosterone; 15α-Hydroxy-DHEA; 15α-OH-DHEA

Identifiers
CAS Number	38391-29-6
3D model (JSmol)	Interactive image
ChemSpider	167725
PubChem CID	193284
UNII	262794D86L
CompTox Dashboard (EPA)	DTXSID90959311
- InChI: InChI=1S/C19H28O3/c1-18-7-5-12(20)9-11(18)3-4-13-14(18)6-8-19(2)16(22)10-15(21)17(13)19/h3,12-15,17,20-21H,4-10H2,1-2H3/t12-,13+,14-,15-,17+,18-,19+/m0/s1 Key: SWXQUEHVFFSZOW-CRYRVXFVSA-N; InChI=1/C19H28O3/c1-18-7-5-12(20)9-11(18)3-4-13-14(18)6-8-19(2)16(22)10-15(21)17(13)19/h3,12-15,17,20-21H,4-10H2,1-2H3/t12-,13+,14-,15-,17+,18-,19+/m0/s1 Key: SWXQUEHVFFSZOW-CRYRVXFVBS
- SMILES: C[C@]12CC[C@@H](CC1=CC[C@@H]3[C@@H]2CC[C@]4([C@H]3[C@H](CC4=O)O)C)O

Properties
Chemical formula	C_{19}H_{28}O_{3}
Molar mass	304.430 g·mol^{−1}
- Except where otherwise noted, data are given for materials in their standard state (at 25 °C [77 °F], 100 kPa). Infobox references

15α-Hydroxydehydroepiandrosterone, abbreviated as 15α-hydroxy-DHEA or 15α-OH-DHEA, is an endogenous metabolite of dehydroepiandrosterone (DHEA). Both 15α-OH-DHEA and its 3β-sulfate ester, 15α-OH-DHEA-S, are intermediates in the biosynthesis of estetrol from dehydroepiandrosterone (DHEA).

== See also ==
- 16α-Hydroxydehydroepiandrosterone
- 16α-Hydroxyandrostenedione
- 16α-Hydroxyestrone
