= Testosterone and the cardiovascular system =

Testosterone and the cardiovascular system are the effects that the male hormone testosterone has on the cardiovascular system.

The predominant androgen in men, testosterone, has shown to substantially decline throughout the aging process. The decline in both serum and total testosterone with age have been linked to several disease states in men. In particular, cardiac failure and ischemic heart disease have been linked to this natural biochemical decline in testosterone. Previously, the higher cardiovascular risk in men has been attributed in part to the negative effects of systemic testosterone, however, more recent research has highlighted the protective nature of testosterone against cardiovascular disease. The magnitude and mechanism of action by which low testosterone in men is influential in the pathogenesis of cardiovascular risk and the potential benefits of testosterone therapy has yet to be fully determined.

== Systemic effects ==
Low testosterone is associated with an increased risk for coronary artery disease through the promotion of a pro-atherosclerotic environment. Some research has identified testosterone as a vasodilator and an endothelium-repairing hormone within many regions in the body, including the coronary arteries. Recent research depicts testosterone as important in decreasing the production of inflammatory cytokines such as tumor necrosis factor alpha, interleukin-1beta and interleukin-6, which are influential in atherosclerotic profiles. Although it is believed that the reduction in inflammatory cytokines is related to a decreased atherosclerotic profile, the full explanation of this mechanism requires further research.

Testosterone has also shown to be effective as an anti-atherosclerotic through preventing aortic cholesterol deposition in both rabbits fed high cholesterol diets and mice with low-density lipoprotein gene knockout. Fatty deposition within the aorta associated with low endogenous testosterone has been determined to be independent of the androgen receptor. Although the mechanism has yet to be fully determined, aromatase activity and the activation of estrogen receptor alpha is partially responsible for the atherosclerotic profile characteristic of low testosterone.

Decreased systemic testosterone in men has also been reported in men with heart failure, whereby the severity of the disease is proportional to the reduction in systemic testosterone levels. Although a direct mechanism of action is not fully understood, some research attribute low testosterone to advancing side effects of heart failure, such as decreased exercise ability, decreased muscle mass, fatigue/dyspnea and cachexia.

== Replacement therapy ==
Physiological testosterone is crucial for normal functionality in men. Long-term administration of physiological testosterone in mouse models has shown to be atheroprotective by increasing the HDL portion of cholesterol (the anti-atherosclerotic cholesterol). The beneficial action of testosterone in elevating the HDL fraction can be attributed to its conversion via aromatase activity in adipose tissue into 17-beta estradiol and its subsequent activation of estrogen alpha-receptors; thus, more testosterone leads to greater conversion into estrogen and thus a healthier lipid profile. This understanding has been determined in several studies, although results of these studies are contradictory.

Testosterone replacement therapy in men diagnosed with pre-existing heart disease has been related to an increased risk of myocardial infarction. Furthermore, recent research has linked testosterone replacement therapy to an increase in deaths and other cardiovascular occurrences in men whom document a history of coronary artery disease. Further research is required to determine the full extent to which testosterone replacement therapy in aging men plays a role in the risk and/or advantage of cardiovascular occurrences.

However, when given to men with hypogonadism in the short- and medium-term, testosterone replacement therapy does not increase the risk of cardiovascular events (including strokes and heart attacks and other heart diseases). The long-term safety of the therapy for this condition is not known yet.
