= Adrenosterone =

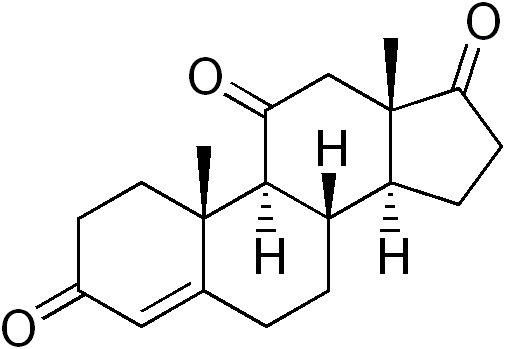

Names
- IUPAC name Androst-4-ene-3,11,17-trione
- Systematic IUPAC name (3aS,3bS,9aR,9bS,11aS)-9a,11a-Dimethyl-2,3,3a,3b,4,5,8,9,9a,9b,11,11a-dodecahydro-1H-cyclopenta[a]phenanthrene-1,7,10-trione
- Other names Reichstein's substance G

Identifiers
CAS Number	382-45-6
3D model (JSmol)	Interactive image
ChEBI	CHEBI:2495
ChEMBL	ChEMBL485683
ChemSpider	194597
ECHA InfoCard	100.006.222
MeSH	Adrenosterone
PubChem CID	223997
UNII	AE4E9102GY
CompTox Dashboard (EPA)	DTXSID801019311
- InChI: InChI=1S/C19H24O3/c1-18-8-7-12(20)9-11(18)3-4-13-14-5-6-16(22)19(14,2)10-15(21)17(13)18/h9,13-14,17H,3-8,10H2,1-2H3/t13-,14-,17+,18-,19-/m0/s1 Key: RZRPTBIGEANTGU-IRIMSJTPSA-N; InChI=1/C19H24O3/c1-18-8-7-12(20)9-11(18)3-4-13-14-5-6-16(22)19(14,2)10-15(21)17(13)18/h9,13-14,17H,3-8,10H2,1-2H3/t13-,14-,17+,18-,19-/m0/s1 Key: RZRPTBIGEANTGU-IRIMSJTPBG
- SMILES: O=C4/C=C3/CC[C@@H]2[C@H](C(=O)C[C@@]1(C(=O)CC[C@H]12)C)[C@@]3(C)CC4

Properties
Chemical formula	C_{19}H_{24}O_{3}
Molar mass	300.39 g/mol
Melting point	222 °C (432 °F; 495 K)
- Except where otherwise noted, data are given for materials in their standard state (at 25 °C [77 °F], 100 kPa). verify (what is ?) Infobox references

Adrenosterone, also known as Reichstein's substance G , as well as 11-ketoandrostenedione (11-KA4), 11-oxoandrostenedione (11-OXO), and androst-4-ene-3,11,17-trione, is a steroid hormone with an extremely weak androgenic effect, and an intermediate/prohormone of 11-ketotestosterone. It was first isolated in 1936 from the adrenal cortex by Tadeus Reichstein at the Pharmaceutical Institute in the University of Basel. Originally, adrenosterone was called Reichstein's substance G. Adrenosterone occurs in trace amounts in humans as well as most mammals and in larger amounts in fish, where it is a precursor to the primary androgen, 11-ketotestosterone.

Adrenosterone is sold as a dietary supplement since 2007 as a fat loss and muscle gaining supplement. It is thought to be a competitive selective 11βHSD1 inhibitor, which is responsible for activation of cortisol from cortisone. Thus preventing muscle breakdown, and contributing to a majority of its effects.

Adrenosterone is used as an intermediate in the synthesis of fluoxymesterone and in the RTI synthesis of dimethandrolone.

== See also ==
- 11β-Hydroxyandrostenedione
- 11-Ketodihydrotestosterone
