= 16α-Hydroxyandrostenedione =

Names
- IUPAC name 16α-Hydroxyandrost-4-ene-3,17-dione
- Systematic IUPAC name (2R,3aS,3bR,9aR,9bS,11aS)-2-Hydroxy-9a,11a-dimethyl-2,3,3a,4,5,8,9,9a,9b,10,11,11a-dodecahydro-1H-cyclopenta[a]phenanthrene-1,7(3bH)-dione
- Other names 16α-OH-A4

Identifiers
CAS Number	63-02-5
3D model (JSmol)	Interactive image
ChEBI	CHEBI:27582
ChEMBL	ChEMBL1908014
ChemSpider	389474
PubChem CID	440574
UNII	JN8H7214IR
CompTox Dashboard (EPA)	DTXSID20331500
- InChI: InChI=1S/C19H26O3/c1-18-7-5-12(20)9-11(18)3-4-13-14(18)6-8-19(2)15(13)10-16(21)17(19)22/h9,13-16,21H,3-8,10H2,1-2H3/t13-,14+,15+,16-,18+,19+/m1/s1 Key: SSBCZTXGVMMZOT-NBBHSKLNSA-N
- SMILES: C[C@]12CCC(=O)C=C1CC[C@@H]3[C@@H]2CC[C@]4([C@H]3C[C@H](C4=O)O)C

Properties
Chemical formula	C_{19}H_{26}O_{3}
Molar mass	302.414 g/mol
- Except where otherwise noted, data are given for materials in their standard state (at 25 °C [77 °F], 100 kPa). Infobox references

16α-Hydroxyandrostenedione (16α-OH-A4), also known as 16α-hydroxyandrost-4-ene-3,17-dione, is an endogenous and naturally occurring steroid and metabolic intermediate in the biosynthesis of estriol during pregnancy. It is produced from dehydroepiandrosterone (DHEA), which is converted into 16α-hydroxy-DHEA sulfate, then desulfated and aromatized into 16α-hydroxyestrone, and finally converted into estriol by 17β-hydroxysteroid dehydrogenase.

== See also ==
- 15α-Hydroxydehydroepiandrosterone
- Androstenedione
- 11β-Hydroxyandrostenedione
