= 7-Keto-DHEA =

- 7-Keto-DHEA

- 7-Keto-DHEA acetate

Names
- IUPAC name 3β-Hydroxyandrost-5-ene-7,17-dione
- Systematic IUPAC name (3aS,3bR,7S,9aR,9bS,11aS)-9a,11a-Dimethyl-2,3,3a,6,7,8,9,9a,9b,10,11,11a-dodecahydro-1H-cyclopenta[a]phenanthrene-1,4(3bH)-dione
- Other names 7-Oxo-DHEA; 7-Ketodehydroepiandrosterone; 7-Oxodehydroepiandrosterone; 3β-Hydroxyandrost-5-ene-7,17-dione; Androst-5-en-3β-ol-7,17-dione

Identifiers
CAS Number	566-19-8; 1449-61-2 (acetate)
3D model (JSmol)	Interactive image
ChEBI	CHEBI:183808
ChemSpider	167751
PubChem CID	193313
UNII	2334LJD2E9; 84RQ0XOM11 (acetate)
CompTox Dashboard (EPA)	DTXSID801024029
- InChI: InChI=1S/C19H26O3/c1-18-7-5-12(20)9-11(18)10-15(21)17-13-3-4-16(22)19(13,2)8-6-14(17)18/h10,12-14,17,20H,3-9H2,1-2H3/t12-,13-,14-,17-,18-,19-/m0/s1 Key: KPRGOTLNGIBVFL-GINZOMEDSA-N; InChI=1/C19H26O3/c1-18-7-5-12(20)9-11(18)10-15(21)17-13-3-4-16(22)19(13,2)8-6-14(17)18/h10,12-14,17,20H,3-9H2,1-2H3/t12-,13-,14-,17-,18-,19-/m0/s1 Key: KPRGOTLNGIBVFL-GINZOMEDBE
- SMILES: O=C2\C=C4/[C@]([C@H]3CC[C@@]1(C(=O)CC[C@H]1[C@H]23)C)(C)CC[C@H](O)C4

Properties
Chemical formula	C_{19}H_{26}O_{3}
Molar mass	302.414 g·mol^{−1}
- Except where otherwise noted, data are given for materials in their standard state (at 25 °C [77 °F], 100 kPa). Infobox references

7-Ketodehydroepiandrosterone (7-keto-DHEA, 7-oxo-DHEA), also known as 7-oxoprasterone, is a steroid prohormone produced by metabolism of the prohormone dehydroepiandrosterone (DHEA).

== Pharmacodynamics ==
7-Keto-DHEA is not directly converted to testosterone or estrogen by the human body. Due to this fact, the suppliers of supplements have investigated it as a potentially more useful relative of the DHEA steroid when used as a supplementation, but the results are inconclusive.

== Unsubstantiated health claims ==
The benefits of 7-keto-DHEA supplementation are not definitively established. The health claims on potential weight loss benefits are not supported by solid evidence. The current evidence is mixed and limited by factors such as small sample sizes, short study durations, and a lack of diversity in the study populations. The safety profile of 7-keto-DHEA appears to be generally well-tolerated with a low side-effect profile, but changes in blood hormone parameters have been reported. Given these uncertainties, the potential benefits and safety of 7-keto-DHEA, particularly with long-term use, are not established. The US Food and Drug Administration (FDA) has not added 7-keto-DHEA to the list of bulk drug substances due to a lack of clinical evidence regarding its safety and efficacy.

In particular, 7-Keto-DHEA is marketed (also as 7-oxo-DHEA) to be more effective than DHEA for inducing heat production (thermogenesis) to be used in weight loss: because dieting is usually accompanied by reduced resting metabolic rate, obese persons may benefit from using 7-keto-DHEA when dieting due to increased metabolic rate. Still, these claimed benefits are not supported by solid evidence.

7-Keto-DHEA has also been marketed by alternative medicine providers as a treatment of adrenal fatigue, a pseudo-scientific term with no scholarly basis.

== Chemistry ==
7-keto-DHEA is a prohormone produced by metabolism of the prohormone dehydroepiandrosterone (DHEA).

7-Keto-DHEA has a number of chemical names, including:

- 7-Ketodehydroepiandrosterone (7-keto-DHEA)
- 7-Oxodehydroepiandrosterone (7-oxo-DHEA)
- 7-Ketoprasterone
- 7-Oxoprasterone
- 3β-Hydroxyandrost-5-ene-7,17-dione
- Androst-5-en-3β-ol-7,17-dione

For the acetate ester:

- 3β-Acetoxyandrost-5-ene-7,17-dione
- 7-Oxo-dehydroepiandrosterone acetate (7-oxo-DHEA acetate)
- 3-Acetyl-7-oxo-dehydroepiandrosterone (3-acetyl-7-oxo-DHEA)
- DHEA acetate-7-one
- Δ_{5}-Androstene-3β-acetoxy-7,17-dione

Note: "Keto" can be substituted for "oxo" in the above names.

== Regulation ==
The FDA has proposed that 7-Keto-DHEA be included among substances banned from use in compounded drugs.

7-Keto-DHEA may trigger positive tests for performance-enhancing drugs.

The World Anti-Doping Agency (WADA) lists 7-keto-DHEA as a prohibited anabolic agent.

== See also ==
- List of investigational anxiolytics
- 7α-Hydroxy-DHEA
- 7β-Hydroxy-DHEA
- 7α-Hydroxyepiandrosterone
- 7β-Hydroxyepiandrosterone
