= 16α-Hydroxy-DHEA =

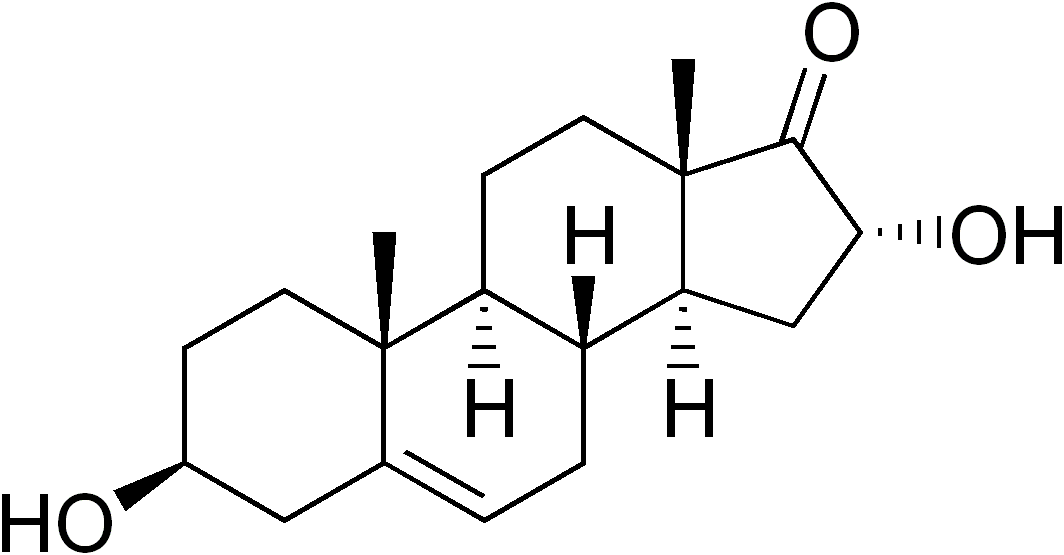

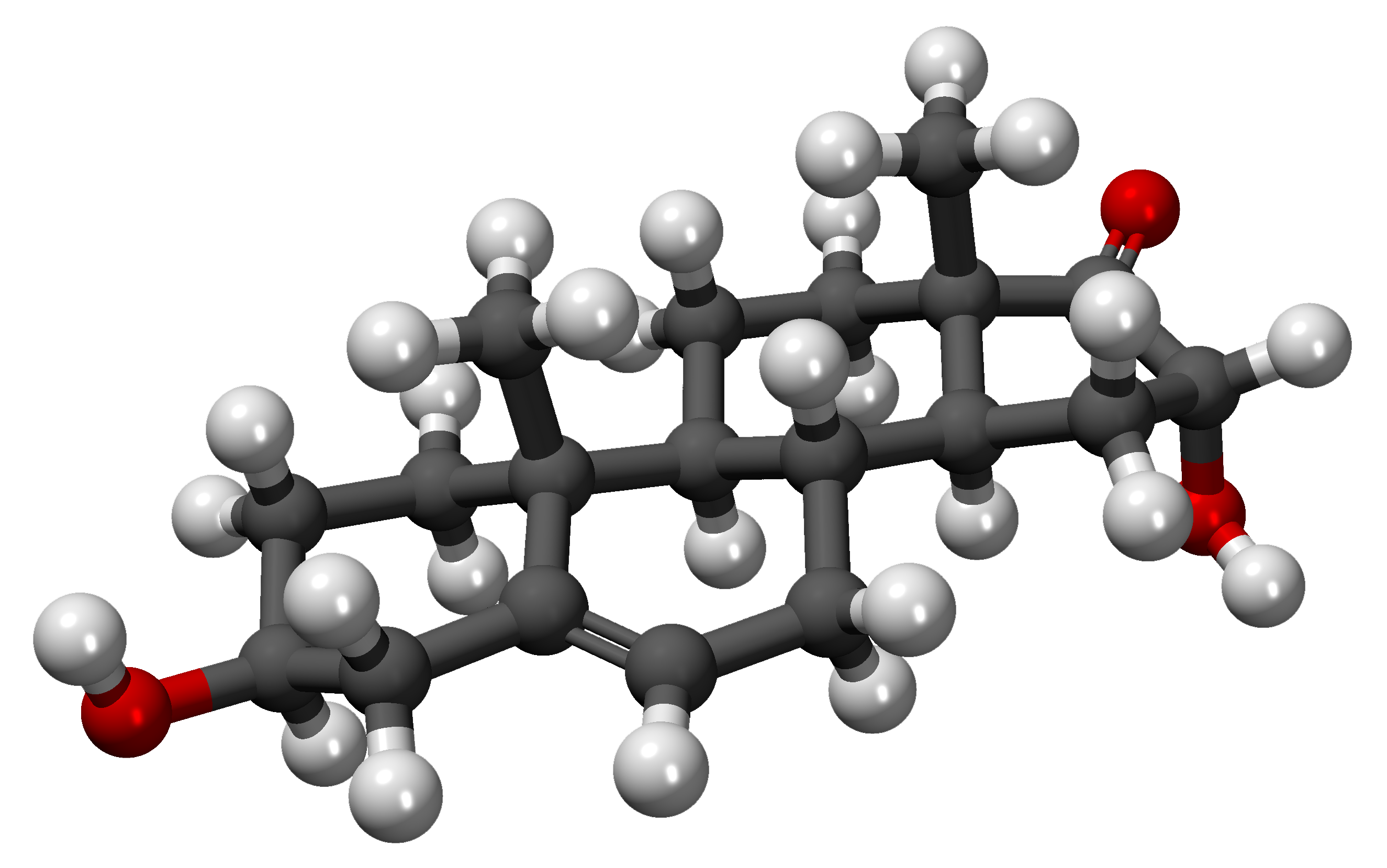

Names
- IUPAC name 3β,16α-Dihydroxyandrost-5-en-17-one
- Systematic IUPAC name (2R,3aS,3bR,7S,9aR,9bS,11aS)-3,7-Dihydroxy-9a,11a-dimethyl-2,3,3a,3b,4,6,7,8,9,9a,9b,10,11,11a-tetradecahydro-1H-cyclopenta[a]phenanthren-1-one

Identifiers
| CAS Number | 1232-73-1 |
| 3D model (JSmol) | Interactive image |
| ChEBI | CHEBI:27771 |
| ChemSpider | 92168 |
| PubChem CID | 102030 |
| UNII | WU2DU6GA72 |
| CompTox Dashboard (EPA) | DTXSID90153892 |
- InChI: InChI=1S/C19H28O3/c1-18-7-5-12(20)9-11(18)3-4-13-14(18)6-8-19(2)15(13)10-16(21)17(19)22/h3,12-16,20-21H,4-10H2,1-2H3/t12-,13+,14-,15-,16+,18-,19-/m0/s1 Key: QQIVKFZWLZJXJT-DNKQKWOHSA-N; InChI=1/C19H28O3/c1-18-7-5-12(20)9-11(18)3-4-13-14(18)6-8-19(2)15(13)10-16(21)17(19)22/h3,12-16,20-21H,4-10H2,1-2H3/t12-,13+,14-,15-,16+,18-,19-/m0/s1 Key: QQIVKFZWLZJXJT-DNKQKWOHBQ
- SMILES: O=C3[C@]2(CC[C@@H]1[C@@]4(C(=C/C[C@H]1[C@@H]2C[C@H]3O)\C[C@@H](O)CC4)C)C

Properties
| Chemical formula | C_{19}H_{28}O_{3} |
| Molar mass | 304.42 g/mol |
- Except where otherwise noted, data are given for materials in their standard state (at 25 °C [77 °F], 100 kPa). verify (what is ?) Infobox references

16α-Hydroxydehydroepiandrosterone (16α-hydroxy-DHEA or 16α-OH-DHEA) is an endogenous metabolite of dehydroepiandrosterone (DHEA). Both 16α-OH-DHEA and its 3β-sulfate ester, 16α-OH-DHEA-S, are intermediates in the biosynthesis of estriol from dehydroepiandrosterone (DHEA). 16α-OH-DHEA has estrogenic activity.

== See also ==
- 15α-Hydroxydehydroepiandrosterone
- 16α-Hydroxyandrostenedione
- 16α-Hydroxyestrone
- Cetadiol
