= 7α-Hydroxy-DHEA =

Names
- IUPAC name 3β,7α-Dihydroxyandrost-5-ene-17-one
- Systematic IUPAC name (3aS,3bR,4S,7S,9aR,9bS,11aS)-4,7-Dihydroxy-9a,11a-dimethyl-2,3,3a,3b,4,6,7,8,9,9a,9b,10,11,11a-tetradecahydro-1H-cyclopenta[a]phenanthren-1-one
- Other names 7α-OH-DHEA; Androst-5-en-3β,7α-diol-17-one

Identifiers
CAS Number	53-00-9
3D model (JSmol)	Interactive image
ChEBI	CHEBI:81471
ChEMBL	ChEMBL1079392
ChemSpider	58963
KEGG	C18045
PubChem CID	65517
UNII	CL15H93XTM
CompTox Dashboard (EPA)	DTXSID901018916
- InChI: InChI=1S/C19H28O3/c1-18-7-5-12(20)9-11(18)10-15(21)17-13-3-4-16(22)19(13,2)8-6-14(17)18/h10,12-15,17,20-21H,3-9H2,1-2H3/t12-,13-,14-,15+,17-,18-,19-/m0/s1 Key: OLPSAOWBSPXZEA-JIEICEMKSA-N
- SMILES: C[C@]12CC[C@H]3[C@H]([C@@H]1CCC2=O)[C@@H](C=C4[C@@]3(CC[C@@H](C4)O)C)O

Properties
Chemical formula	C_{19}H_{28}O_{3}
Molar mass	304.430 g·mol^{−1}
- Except where otherwise noted, data are given for materials in their standard state (at 25 °C [77 °F], 100 kPa). Infobox references

7α-Hydroxydehydroepiandrosterone (7α-hydroxy-DHEA; 7α-OH-DHEA), also known as 3β,7α-dihydroxyandrost-5-ene-17-one, is an endogenous, naturally occurring steroid and a major metabolite of dehydroepiandrosterone (DHEA) that is formed by CYP7B1 (steroid 7α-hydroxylase) in tissues such as the prostate gland and by CYP3A4 in the liver. The major metabolic pathway of DHEA outside the liver is via 7-hydroxylation into 7α-OH-DHEA and 7β-OH-DHEA. 7α-OH-DHEA has weak estrogenic activity, selectively activating the estrogen receptor ERβ. In addition, 7α-OH-DHEA may be responsible for the known antiglucocorticoid effects of DHEA.

Serum levels of 7α-OH-DHEA have been found to be significantly elevated in patients with Alzheimer's disease. It is unclear what significance this may have, if any.

7α-OH-DHEA is on the World Anti-Doping Agency list of prohibited substances in sporting.

== See also ==
- 7-Keto-DHEA
- 7α-Hydroxyepiandrosterone
- 7β-Hydroxyepiandrosterone
