= CYP7B1 =

Protein-coding gene in the species Homo sapiens

Identifiers
- Aliases: CYP7B1, CBAS3, CP7B, SPG5A, cytochrome P450 family 7 subfamily B member 1
- External IDs: OMIM: 603711; MGI: 104978; GeneCards: CYP7B1
Enzyme activity
EC #	BRENDA	ExPASy	KEGG	MetaCyc
1.14.14.26	↗	↗	↗	↗
1.14.14.29	↗	↗	↗	↗

Gene location (Human)
Chr.	Chromosome 8 (human)
Band	8q12.3	Start	64,587,763 bp
Band	8q12.3	End	64,798,737 bp

Gene location (Mouse)
Chr.	Chromosome 3 (mouse)
Band	3 A1|3 4.98 cM	Start	18,126,114 bp
Band	3 A1|3 4.98 cM	End	18,297,502 bp
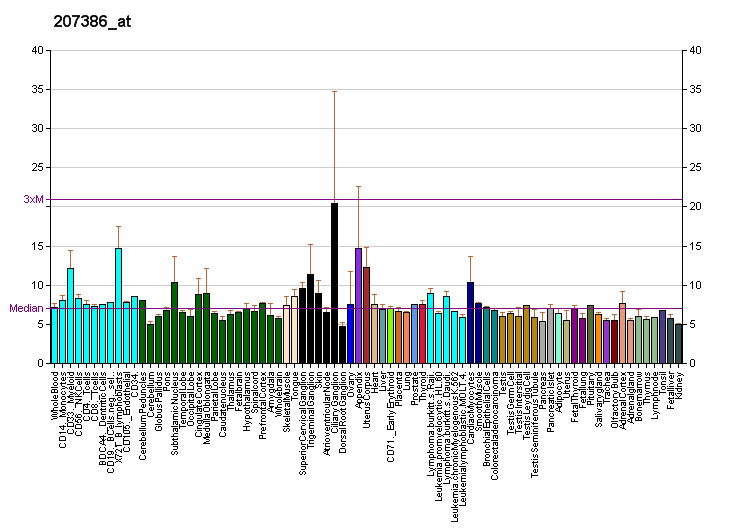
RNA expression pattern
Bgee	Human / Mouse (ortholog); Top expressed in: seminal vesicula; oral cavity; ventricular zone; skin of hip; corpus callosum; retinal pigment epithelium; C1 segment; tibia; epithelium of colon; liver / Top expressed in: left lobe of liver; right kidney; renal calyx; efferent ductule; vas deferens; vestibular sensory epithelium; proximal tubule; sciatic nerve; human kidney; gallbladder; More reference expression data
BioGPS	More reference expression data
Gene ontology
Molecular function	iron ion binding; metal ion binding; monooxygenase activity; heme binding; oxidoreductase activity, acting on paired donors, with incorporation or reduction of molecular oxygen; oxidoreductase activity; oxysterol 7-alpha-hydroxylase activity
Cellular component	organelle membrane; endoplasmic reticulum membrane; membrane; intracellular membrane-bounded organelle; endoplasmic reticulum
Biological process	steroid metabolic process; positive regulation of epithelial cell proliferation; lipid metabolism; cholesterol metabolic process; prostate gland epithelium morphogenesis; sterol metabolic process; bile acid biosynthetic process; negative regulation of intracellular estrogen receptor signaling pathway; B cell chemotaxis; cholesterol homeostasis
Sources:Amigo / QuickGO
Orthologs
Databases	NCBI: entry; OMA: entry
Species	Human	Mouse
Entrez	9420	13123
Ensembl	ENSG00000172817	ENSMUSG00000039519
UniProt	O75881	Q60991
RefSeq (mRNA)	NM_004820; NM_001324112	NM_007825
RefSeq (protein)	NP_001311041; NP_004811	NP_031851
Location (UCSC)	Chr 8: 64.59 – 64.8 Mb	Chr 3: 18.13 – 18.3 Mb
PubMed search
- Wikidata
View/Edit Human	View/Edit Mouse

25-hydroxycholesterol 7-alpha-hydroxylase also known as oxysterol and steroid 7-alpha-hydroxylase is an enzyme that in humans is encoded by the CYP7B1 gene. This gene encodes a member of the cytochrome P450 superfamily of enzymes. The cytochrome P450 proteins are monooxygenases which catalyze many reactions involved in drug metabolism and synthesis of cholesterol, steroids and other lipids.

== Function ==
This endoplasmic reticulum membrane protein catalyzes the first reaction in the cholesterol catabolic pathway of extrahepatic tissues, which converts cholesterol to bile acids. This enzyme likely plays a minor role in total bile acid synthesis, but may also be involved in the development of atherosclerosis, neurosteroid metabolism and sex hormone synthesis.

CYP7B was discovered by Stapleton in a screen for transcripts expressed differentially in rat hippocampus versus the remainder of the brain. The encoded polypeptide, initially designated hct-1 (hippocampus transcript 1), had significant homology with CYP7A1. The protein was designated CYP7B1 by the P450 Nomenclature Committee. Expression of the recombinant protein demonstrated 7alpha-hydroxylation activity for steroids (DHEA, pregnenolone) and oxysterols including 25-hydroxycholesterol and 27-hydroxycholesterol, confirmed by knockout in mouse that abolished oxysterol hydroxylation in liver and brain and steroid hydroxylation in multiple tissues. Reporter tagging of the Cyp7b1 gene demonstrated that the enzyme is widely expressed, particularly strongly in brain, liver, kidney, heart, and spleen.
