= Estetrol =

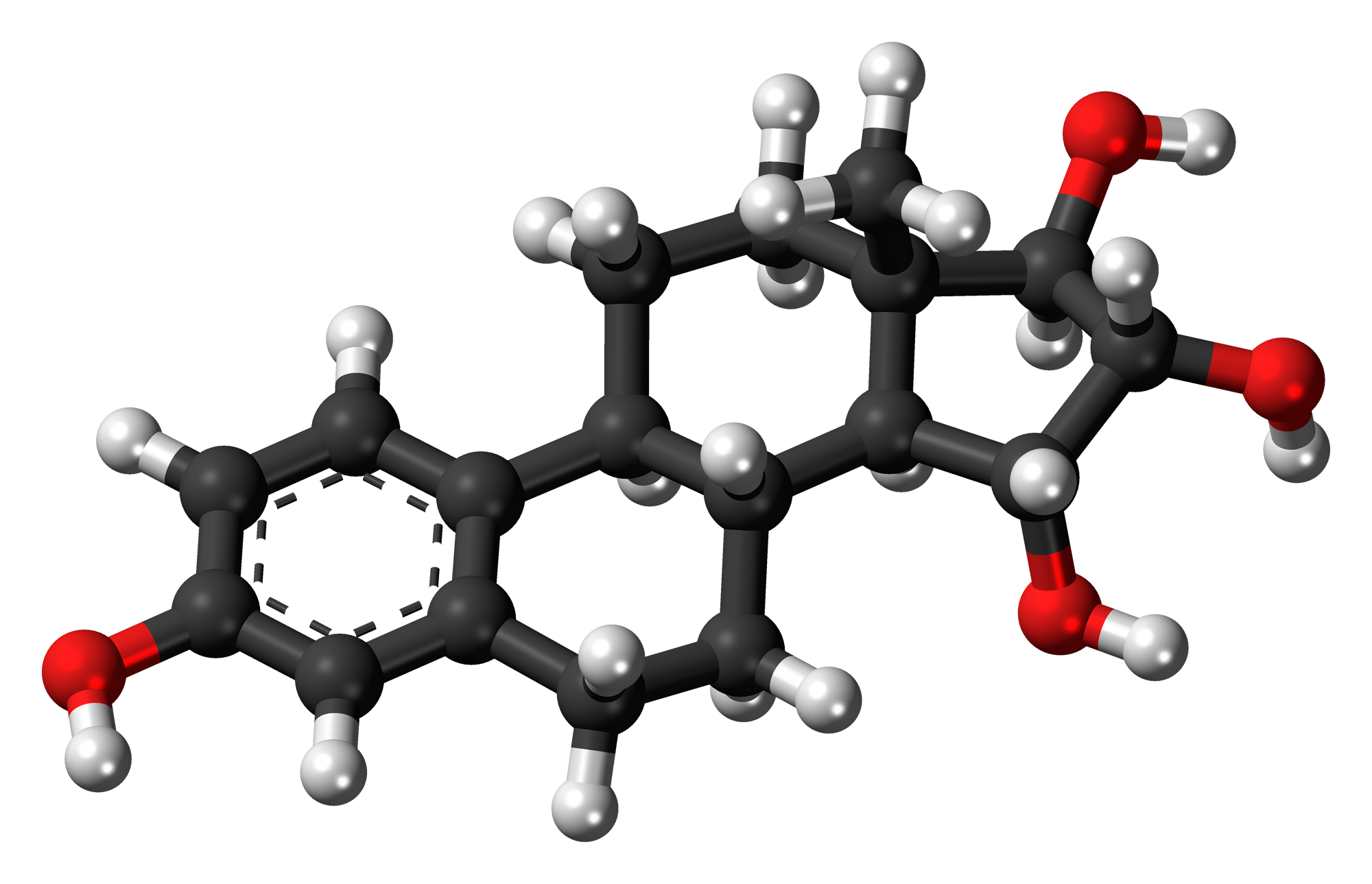

Names
- IUPAC name Estra-1,3,5(10)-triene-3,15α,16α,17β-tetrol
- Systematic IUPAC name (1R,2R,3R,3aS,3bR,9bS,11aS)-11a-Methyl-2,3,3a,3b,4,5,9b,10,11,11a-decahydro-1H-cyclopenta[a]phenanthrene-1,2,3,7-tetrol
- Other names Oestetrol; E4; 15α-Hydroxyestriol

Identifiers
CAS Number	15183-37-6
3D model (JSmol)	Interactive image
ChEBI	CHEBI:142773
ChEMBL	ChEMBL1230314
ChemSpider	25245
DrugBank	DB12235
ECHA InfoCard	100.276.707
EC Number	840-340-4
KEGG	D11513
PubChem CID	27125
UNII	ENB39R14VF
CompTox Dashboard (EPA)	DTXSID50164888
- InChI: InChI=1S/C18H24O4/c1-18-7-6-12-11-5-3-10(19)8-9(11)2-4-13(12)14(18)15(20)16(21)17(18)22/h3,5,8,12-17,19-22H,2,4,6-7H2,1H3/t12-,13-,14-,15-,16-,17+,18+/m1/s1 Key: AJIPIJNNOJSSQC-NYLIRDPKSA-N
- SMILES: Oc1ccc2[C@H]3CC[C@]4(C)[C@]5([C@@]6[C@@]7[C@H]4[C@@H]3CCc2c1).O7.O6.O5

Properties
Chemical formula	C_{18}H_{24}O_{4}
Molar mass	304.386 g/mol
Solubility in water	1.38 mg/mL
- Except where otherwise noted, data are given for materials in their standard state (at 25 °C [77 °F], 100 kPa). Infobox references

Estetrol (E4), or oestetrol, is one of the four natural estrogenic steroid hormones found in humans, along with estrone (E1), estradiol (E2), and estriol (E3). Estetrol is a major estrogen in the body. In contrast to estrone and estradiol, estetrol is a native estrogen of fetal life. Estetrol is produced exclusively by the fetal liver and is found in detectable levels only during pregnancy, with relatively high levels in the fetus and lower levels in the maternal circulation.

In addition to its physiological role as a native hormone, estetrol can be used as a medication, see estetrol (medication). Estetrol, in combination with drospirenone, has recently been approved as a new estrogenic component of a combined oral contraceptive (COC) and estetrol alone is in clinical development for the treatment of menopausal symptoms as well as breast and prostate cancer.

== Biological function ==
So far, the physiological function of estetrol remains unknown. The potential role of estetrol as a marker for fetal well-being has been studied quite extensively, but no correlation was found due to the large intra- and inter-individual variation in maternal estetrol plasma levels during pregnancy.

== Biological activity ==
Estetrol has a moderate affinity for estrogen receptors alpha (ERα) and beta (ERβ), with K_{i} values of 4.9 nM and 19 nM, respectively. As such, estetrol has 4- to 5-fold preference for ERα over ERβ. In different animal models, the potency of estetrol regarding its estrogenic effect observed in vivo is generally 10 to 20 times lower than the potency of ethinyl estradiol (EE) and is also lower than the potency of estradiol. Estetrol displays a highly selective binding to its primary targets ERα and ERβ, which ensures that estetrol has a low risk of non-specific side effects.

Selected biological properties of endogenous estrogens in rats
Estrogen	ER RBA (%)	Uterine weight (%)	Uterotrophy	LH levels (%)	SHBG RBA (%)
Control	–	100	–	100	–
Estradiol (E2)	100	506 ± 20	+++	12–19	100
Estrone (E1)	11 ± 8	490 ± 22	+++	?	20
Estriol (E3)	10 ± 4	468 ± 30	+++	8–18	3
Estetrol (E4)	0.5 ± 0.2	?	Inactive	?	1
17α-Estradiol	4.2 ± 0.8	?	?	?	?
2-Hydroxyestradiol	24 ± 7	285 ± 8	+^{b}	31–61	28
2-Methoxyestradiol	0.05 ± 0.04	101	Inactive	?	130
4-Hydroxyestradiol	45 ± 12	?	?	?	?
4-Methoxyestradiol	1.3 ± 0.2	260	++	?	9
4-Fluoroestradiol^{a}	180 ± 43	?	+++	?	?
2-Hydroxyestrone	1.9 ± 0.8	130 ± 9	Inactive	110–142	8
2-Methoxyestrone	0.01 ± 0.00	103 ± 7	Inactive	95–100	120
4-Hydroxyestrone	11 ± 4	351	++	21–50	35
4-Methoxyestrone	0.13 ± 0.04	338	++	65–92	12
16α-Hydroxyestrone	2.8 ± 1.0	552 ± 42	+++	7–24	<0.5
2-Hydroxyestriol	0.9 ± 0.3	302	+^{b}	?	?
2-Methoxyestriol	0.01 ± 0.00	?	Inactive	?	4
Notes: Values are mean ± SD or range. ER RBA = Relative binding affinity to estrogen receptors of rat uterine cytosol. Uterine weight = Percentage change in uterine wet weight of ovariectomized rats after 72 hours with continuous administration of 1 μg/hour via subcutaneously implanted osmotic pumps. LH levels = Luteinizing hormone levels relative to baseline of ovariectomized rats after 24 to 72 hours of continuous administration via subcutaneous implant. Footnotes: ^{a} = Synthetic (i.e., not endogenous). ^{b} = Atypical uterotrophic effect which plateaus within 48 hours (estradiol's uterotrophy continues linearly up to 72 hours). Sources:

== Mode of action ==
=== Tissue-selective effect ===
Estetrol shows selective estrogenic, neutral or anti-estrogenic activities in certain cell types and tissues. In rodent models, estetrol has shown to elicit potent estrogenic activity on ovulation, brain, bone tissue, cardiovascular system, and uterus, associated with ovulation inhibition, prevention of bone demineralization, cardioprotective effects and maintenance of uterovaginal tissues, respectively.

Data from preclinical studies also suggest that estetrol has anti-estrogenic like effects on the breast and a limited impact on normal or malignant breast tissue when used at therapeutic concentration. This property of estetrol is associated with antagonistic effects on breast cell proliferation, migration and invasion in the presence of estradiol.

The molecular mechanisms of action driving its tissue-selective actions rely on a specific profile of ERα activation, uncoupling nuclear and membrane activation.

In the liver, Estetrol has a neutral activity, which is reflected by a minimal impact on synthesis of hepatic coagulation factors, minimal impact on sex hormone-binding globulin (SHBG) synthesis and limited impact on lipid parameters, including triglycerides.

Estetrol can therefore be described as the first Native Estrogen with Selective Tissue activity (NEST).

=== Differences vs SERMs ===
The selective tissue activity of estetrol is different from the effects of selective estrogen receptor modulators (SERMs), like tamoxifen and raloxifene. Estetrol, like SERMs, has selective tissue activity. However, SERMs interact with the ligand binding domain of ERα in a manner that is distinct from that of estrogens, including estetrol. Estetrol recruits the same co-regulators as other estrogens, while SERMs recruit other co-regulators.

=== ERα activation ===
Estrogens can elicit their effects via nuclear ERα and/or membrane ERα signaling pathways. Estetrol presents a distinctive mode of action in terms of ERα activation. Like other estrogens, estetrol binds to, and activates the nuclear ERα to induce gene transcription. However, estetrol induces very limited activity via membrane ERα in several tissues (e.g. in the breast) and antagonizes this pathway in the presence of estradiol, thereby uniquely uncoupling nuclear and membrane activation.

== Biochemistry ==
=== Biosynthesis ===
In the fetal liver, estetrol is synthesized from estradiol (E2) and estriol (E3) by two fetal liver enzymes, 15α- and 16α-hydroxylase, through hydroxylation. Estetrol can be detected in maternal urine from the 9th week of gestation. After birth, the neonatal liver rapidly loses its capacity to synthesize estetrol. During the second trimester of pregnancy, high levels of estetrol can be found in maternal plasma, with steadily rising concentrations of unconjugated estetrol to about 1 ng/mL (>3 nM) towards the end of pregnancy. Fetal plasma levels have been reported to be over 10 times higher than maternal plasma levels at parturition.

=== Distribution ===
In terms of plasma protein binding, estetrol displays moderate binding to albumin, and shows no binding to SHBG. The overall low plasma protein binding results in a ~50% free active fraction. This compares to a 1% active form for EE and ~2% for estradiol. Estetrol is equally distributed between red blood cells and plasma.

=== Metabolism ===
Cytochrome P450 (CYP) enzymes do not play a major role in the metabolism of estetrol. Instead, estetrol undergoes extensive phase 2 metabolism in the liver to form glucuronide and sulphate conjugates. The two main metabolites, estetrol-3-glucuronide and estetrol-16-glucuronide, have negligible estrogenic activity. (see Drospirenone/estetrol)

=== Excretion ===
Estetrol is mainly excreted in urine. Estetrol is an end-stage product of metabolism, which is not converted back into active metabolites like estriol, estradiol or estrone.

== Chemistry ==
Structures of major endogenous estrogens
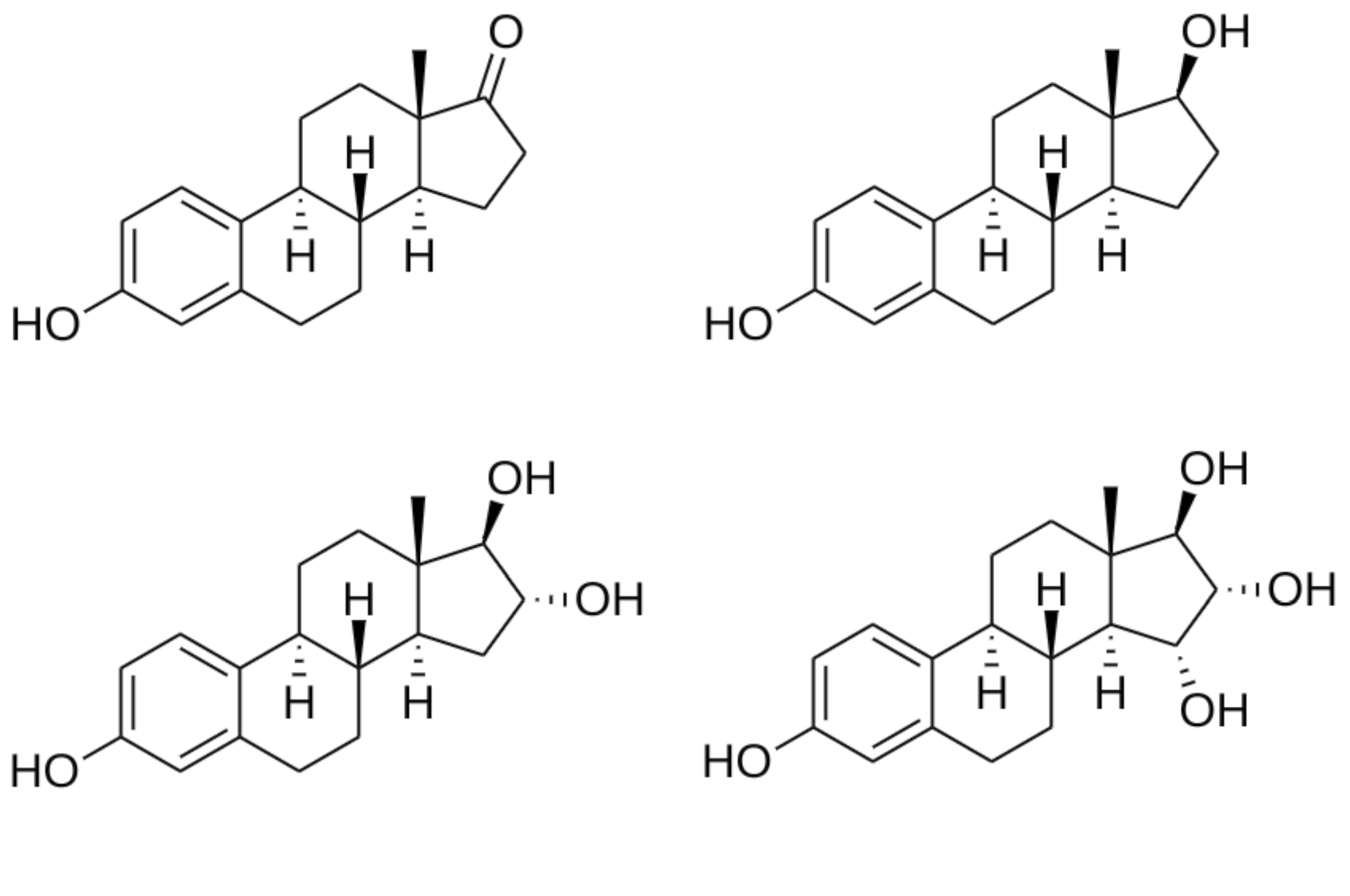
Note the hydroxyl (–OH) groups: estrone (E1) has one, estradiol (E2) has two, estriol (E3) has three, and estetrol (E4) has four.

Estetrol, also known as 15α-hydroxyestriol or as estra-1,3,5(10)-triene-3,15α,16α,17β-tetrol, is an estrane steroid and derivative of estrin (estratriene). It is structurally different from the other estrogens because of the presence of four hydroxyl groups, which explains the abbreviation E4.

=== Synthesis ===
Estetrol itself is a naturally-produced estrogen by the human fetal liver. However, for human use, estetrol is synthesized from estrone, which is obtained from phytosterols extracted from soybeans. The synthesis of estetrol results in very pure estetrol (>99.9%) without contaminants.

== History ==
Estetrol was first described in 1965 by Egon Diczfalusy and coworkers at the Karolinska Institute in Stockholm, Sweden, who identified and isolated this novel, native estrogen from late pregnancy urine and from the urine of newborn infants. Basic research on estetrol was conducted from 1965 to 1984. It was established that estetrol is exclusively synthesized in the human fetal liver. Since 1984, further research was virtually abandoned because estetrol was regarded as a weak and unimportant pregnancy estrogen. In 2001 Herjan Coelingh Bennink at Pantarhei Bioscience in the Netherlands re-started the investigation of estetrol as a potentially useful natural estrogen for human use, resulting in the introduction of E4 as the estrogenic component of a combined oral contraceptive in 2021.
