= 7α-Hydroxyepiandrosterone =

Names
- IUPAC name 3β,7α-Dihydroxy-5α-androstan-17-one
- Systematic IUPAC name (3aS,3bR,4R,5aR,7S,9aS,9bS,11aS)-4,7-Dihydroxy-9a,11a-dimethylhexadecahydro-1H-cyclopenta[a]phenanthren-1-one
- Other names 7α-OH-EPIA; 5α-Androstan-3β,7α-diol-17-one

Identifiers
CAS Number	25848-68-4
3D model (JSmol)	Interactive image
ChEBI	CHEBI:85816
ChEMBL	ChEMBL3391767
ChemSpider	7990794
PubChem CID	9815044
UNII	VB5FN8PDH4
CompTox Dashboard (EPA)	DTXSID601336991
- InChI: InChI=1S/C19H30O3/c1-18-7-5-12(20)9-11(18)10-15(21)17-13-3-4-16(22)19(13,2)8-6-14(17)18/h11-15,17,20-21H,3-10H2,1-2H3/t11-,12+,13+,14+,15-,17+,18+,19+/m1/s1 Key: VFPMCLQMAUVEHD-KMQZSKAMSA-N
- SMILES: C[C@]12CC[C@H]3[C@H]([C@@H]1CCC2=O)[C@H](O)C[C@H]1C[C@@H](O)CC[C@]31C

Properties
Chemical formula	C_{19}H_{30}O_{3}
Molar mass	306.446 g·mol^{−1}
- Except where otherwise noted, data are given for materials in their standard state (at 25 °C [77 °F], 100 kPa). Infobox references

7α-Hydroxyepiandrosterone (7α-OH-EPIA), also known as 3β,7α-dihydroxy-5α-androstan-17-one, is an endogenous, naturally occurring metabolite of epiandrosterone and dehydroepiandrosterone (DHEA) that is formed by the enzyme CYP7B1 in tissues such as the liver and brain.

== See also ==
- 7β-Hydroxyepiandrosterone
- 7α-Hydroxy-DHEA
- 7β-Hydroxy-DHEA
- 7-Oxo-DHEA
