= 11-Ketotestosterone =

Names
- IUPAC name 17β-Hydroxyandrost-4-ene-3,11-dione
- Systematic IUPAC name (1S,3aS,3bS,9aR,9bS,11aS)-1-Hydroxy-9a,11a-dimethyl-2,3,3a,3b,4,5,8,9,9a,9b,11,11a-dodecahydro-1H-cyclopenta[a]phenanthrene-7,10-dione
- Other names 11-Ketotestosterone; 11-Oxotestosterone

Identifiers
CAS Number	564-35-2
3D model (JSmol)	Interactive image; Interactive image
ChemSpider	4445528
PubChem CID	104796
UNII	KF38W1A85U
CompTox Dashboard (EPA)	DTXSID8036499
- InChI: InChI=1S/C19H26O3/c1-18-8-7-12(20)9-11(18)3-4-13-14-5-6-16(22)19(14,2)10-15(21)17(13)18/h9,13-14,16-17,22H,3-8,10H2,1-2H3/t13-,14-,16-,17+,18-,19-/m0/s1 Key: WTPMRQZHJLJSBO-XQALERBDSA-N; InChI=1/C19H26O3/c1-18-8-7-12(20)9-11(18)3-4-13-14-5-6-16(22)19(14,2)10-15(21)17(13)18/h9,13-14,16-17,22H,3-8,10H2,1-2H3/t13-,14-,16-,17+,18-,19-/m0/s1 Key: WTPMRQZHJLJSBO-XQALERBDBO
- SMILES: CC12CCC(=O)C=C1CCC3C2C(=O)CC4(C3CCC4O)C; O=C2C[C@]4([C@H]([C@@H]3CC\C1=C\C(=O)CC[C@]1(C)[C@@H]23)CC[C@@H]4O)C

Properties
Chemical formula	C_{19}H_{26}O_{3}
Molar mass	302.40794
- Except where otherwise noted, data are given for materials in their standard state (at 25 °C [77 °F], 100 kPa). verify (what is ?) Infobox references

11-Ketotestosterone (11-KT) is an oxidized form of testosterone that contains a keto group at the C11 position. It is related to adrenosterone, an androgen found in trace quantities in humans. In fish, 11-ketotestosterone functions as the endogenous androgenic sex hormone. In midshipman fish, 11-ketotestosterone is not present in females or Type II Males — Type II Males reach sexual maturation later, are less territorial, and have higher testosterone than Type I Males.

In mammals, 11-ketotestosterone has similar potency to testosterone as an androgen, and has been identified as an important adrenal androgen. However, unlike testosterone, it is very weakly anabolic and mostly prevents muscle breakdown as opposed to promoting muscle growth. It is synthesized from 11β-hydroxyandrostenedione and, to a lesser extent, 11-ketoandrostenedione (adrenosterone). 11-Ketoandrostenedione has notably been sold online as an androgen prohormone, usually under the name 11-oxoandrostenedione (11-OXO).

== See also ==
- Testosterone
- 11β-Hydroxytestosterone
