= 11β-Hydroxyandrostenedione =

Names
- IUPAC name 11β-Hydroxyandrost-4-ene-3,17-dione
- Systematic IUPAC name (3aS,3bS,9aR,9bS,10S,11aS)-10-Hydroxy-9a,11a-dimethyl-2,3,3b,4,5,8,9,9a,9b,10,11,11a-dodecahydro-1H-cyclopenta[a]phenanthrene-1,7(3aH)-dione
- Other names 11β-Hydroxy-4-androstenedione; 11β-OHA4

Identifiers
CAS Number	382-44-5
3D model (JSmol)	Interactive image
ChEBI	CHEBI:27967
ChEMBL	ChEMBL2311170
ChemSpider	84958
PubChem CID	94141
UNII	41G81C896T
CompTox Dashboard (EPA)	DTXSID8040931
- InChI: InChI=1S/C19H26O3/c1-18-8-7-12(20)9-11(18)3-4-13-14-5-6-16(22)19(14,2)10-15(21)17(13)18/h9,13-15,17,21H,3-8,10H2,1-2H3/t13-,14-,15-,17+,18-,19-/m0/s1 Key: WSCUHXPGYUMQEX-KCZNZURUSA-N
- SMILES: C[C@]12CCC(=O)C=C1CC[C@@H]3[C@@H]2[C@H](C[C@]4([C@H]3CCC4=O)C)O

Properties
Chemical formula	C_{19}H_{26}O_{3}
Molar mass	302.414 g/mol
- Except where otherwise noted, data are given for materials in their standard state (at 25 °C [77 °F], 100 kPa). Infobox references

11β-Hydroxyandrostenedione (11β-OHA4), also known as 11β-hydroxyandrost-4-ene-3,17-dione, is an endogenous, naturally occurring steroid and androgen prohormone that is produced primarily, if not exclusively, in the adrenal glands. It is closely related to adrenosterone (11-ketoandrostenedione; 11-KA4), 11-ketotestosterone (11-KT), and 11-ketodihydrotestosterone (11-KDHT), which are also produced in the adrenal glands.

It can be used as a biomarker for guiding primary aldosteronism subtyping in adrenal vein sampling where blood samples are taken from both adrenal glands to compare the amount of hormone made by each gland.

== See also ==
- 4-Androstenedione
