= 11β-Hydroxytestosterone =

Names
- IUPAC name 11β,17β-Dihydroxyandrost-4-en-3-one
- Systematic IUPAC name (1S,3aS,3bS,9aR,9bS,11aS)-1,10-Dihydroxy-9a,11a-dimethyl-1,2,3,3a,3b,4,5,8,9,9a,9b,10,11,11a-tetradecahydro-7H-cyclopenta[a]phenanthren-7-one

Identifiers
CAS Number	1816-85-9
3D model (JSmol)	Interactive image
ChEBI	CHEBI:81481
ChEMBL	ChEMBL486718
ChemSpider	102866
ECHA InfoCard	100.162.057
EC Number	634-040-0
KEGG	C18075
PubChem CID	114920
UNII	BEF7K94MWQ
CompTox Dashboard (EPA)	DTXSID70939454
- InChI: InChI=1S/C19H28O3/c1-18-8-7-12(20)9-11(18)3-4-13-14-5-6-16(22)19(14,2)10-15(21)17(13)18/h9,13-17,21-22H,3-8,10H2,1-2H3/t13-,14-,15-,16-,17+,18-,19-/m0/s1
- SMILES: C1C2=CC(CC[C@@]2([C@]3([C@H](C[C@]4([C@]([C@@]3(C1)[H])(CC[C@@H]4O)[H])C)O)[H])C)=O

Properties
Chemical formula	C_{19}H_{28}O_{3}
Molar mass	304.430 g·mol^{−1}

Hazards
- GHS labelling
Pictograms	(GHS08: Health hazard)
Signal word	Danger
Hazard statements	H351, H360
Precautionary statements	P201, P202, P281, P308+P313, P405, P501
- Except where otherwise noted, data are given for materials in their standard state (at 25 °C [77 °F], 100 kPa). Infobox references

11β-Hydroxytestosterone is an endogenous steroid, a metabolite of testosterone. Although it may not have significant androgenic activity, it may still be an important precursor to androgenic molecules.

== See also ==
- Testosterone
- 4-Hydroxytestosterone
