= 7β-Hydroxyepiandrosterone =

Names
- IUPAC name 3β,7β-Dihydroxy-5α-androstan-17-one
- Systematic IUPAC name (3aS,3bR,4S,5aR,7S,9aS,9bS,11aS)-4,7-Dihydroxy-9a,11a-dihydroxyhexadecahydro-1H-cyclopenta[a]phenanthren-1-one
- Other names 7β-OH-EPIA; 5α-Androstan-3β,7β-diol-17-one

Identifiers
CAS Number	25848-69-5
3D model (JSmol)	Interactive image
ChEBI	CHEBI:183809
ChemSpider	8011902
PubChem CID	9836181
UNII	OCP3E5KD08
CompTox Dashboard (EPA)	DTXSID701293235
- InChI: InChI=1S/C19H30O3/c1-18-7-5-12(20)9-11(18)10-15(21)17-13-3-4-16(22)19(13,2)8-6-14(17)18/h11-15,17,20-21H,3-10H2,1-2H3/t11-,12+,13+,14+,15+,17+,18+,19+/m1/s1 Key: VFPMCLQMAUVEHD-UCPSWNCLSA-N
- SMILES: C[C@]12CC[C@@H](C[C@@H]1C[C@@H]([C@@H]3[C@@H]2CC[C@]4([C@H]3CCC4=O)C)O)O

Properties
Chemical formula	C_{19}H_{30}O_{3}
Molar mass	306.446 g·mol^{−1}
- Except where otherwise noted, data are given for materials in their standard state (at 25 °C [77 °F], 100 kPa). Infobox references

7β-Hydroxyepiandrosterone (7β-OH-EPIA), also known as 5α-androstan-3β,7β-diol-17-one, is an endogenous androgen, estrogen, and neurosteroid that is produced from dehydroepiandrosterone and epiandrosterone. It has neuroprotective effects and, along with 7α-hydroxyepiandrosterone, may mediate the neuroprotective effects of DHEA. 7β-OH-EPIA may act as a highly potent antagonist of the G protein-coupled estrogen receptor (GPER) (affinity of <1 nM).
