= Dehydroepiandrosterone =

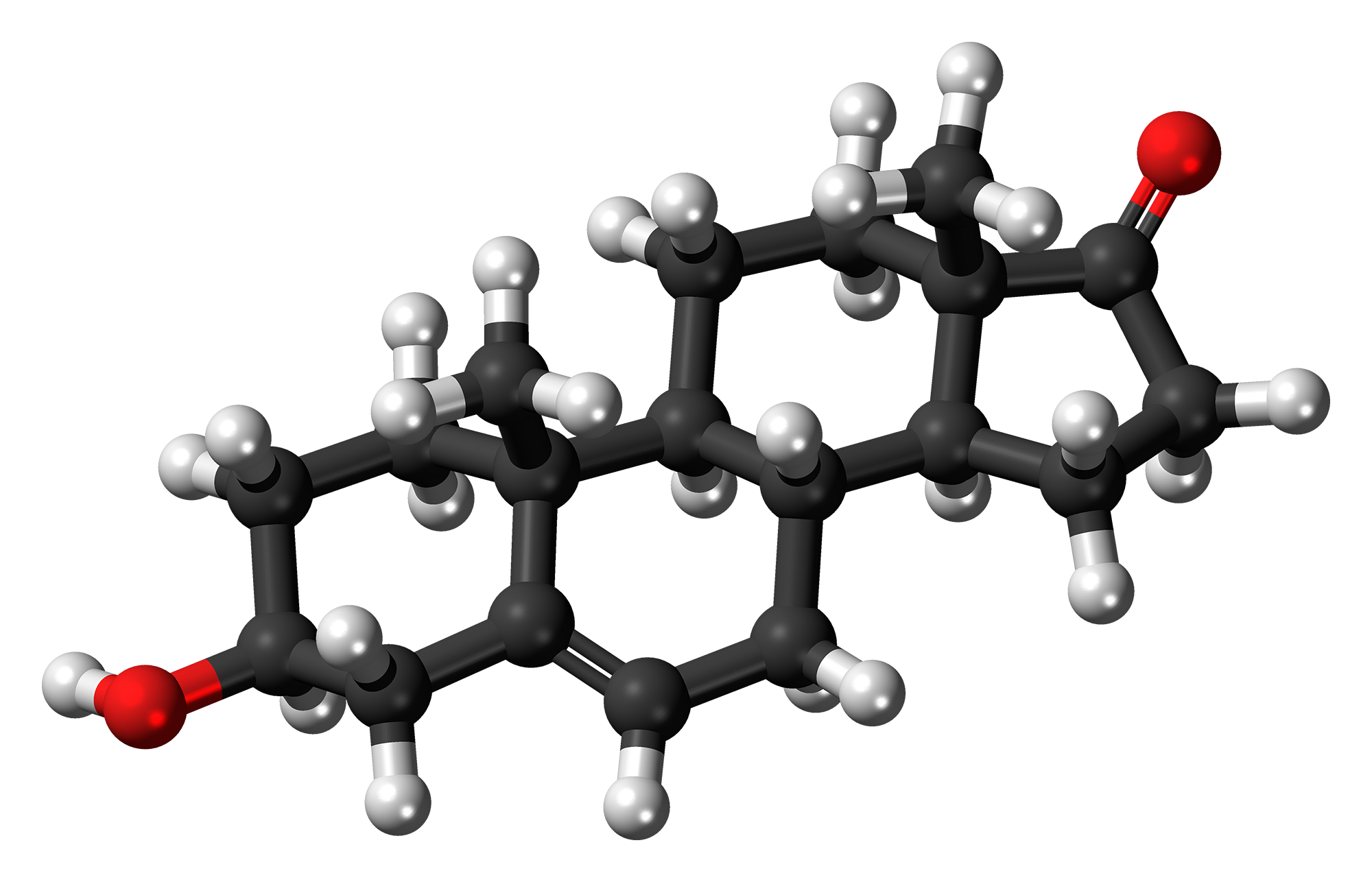

Names
- IUPAC name 3β-Hydroxyandrost-5-en-17-one
- Systematic IUPAC name (3aS,3bR,7S,9aR,9bS,11aS)-7-Hydroxy-9a,11a-dimethyl-2,3,3a,3b,4,6,7,8,9,9a,9b,10,11,11a-tetradecahydro-1H-cyclopenta[a]phenanthren-1-one
- Other names Androstenolone; Prasterone; Androst-5-en-3β-ol-17-one; 5,6-Didehydroepiandrosterone; Dehydroisoepiandrosterone

Identifiers
CAS Number	53-43-0
3D model (JSmol)	Interactive image
ChEBI	CHEBI:28689
ChEMBL	ChEMBL90593
ChemSpider	5670
DrugBank	DB01708
ECHA InfoCard	100.000.160
PubChem CID	5881
UNII	459AG36T1B
CompTox Dashboard (EPA)	DTXSID4020379
- InChI: InChI=1S/C19H28O2/c1-18-9-7-13(20)11-12(18)3-4-14-15-5-6-17(21)19(15,2)10-8-16(14)18/h3,13-16,20H,4-11H2,1-2H3/t13-,14-,15-,16-,18-,19-/m0/s1 Key: FMGSKLZLMKYGDP-USOAJAOKSA-N
- SMILES: O=C3[C@]2(CC[C@@H]1[C@@]4(C(=C/C[C@H]1[C@@H]2CC3)\C[C@@H](O)CC4)C)C

Properties
Chemical formula	C_{19}H_{28}O_{2}
Molar mass	288.424 g/mol
Melting point	148.5

Pharmacology
ATCvet code	QA14AA07 (WHO); G03EA03 (WHO) (combination with estrogen)
Routes of administration	By mouth, vaginal (insert), intramuscular injection (as prasterone enanthate), injection (as prasterone sodium sulfate)
- Pharmacokinetics
Bioavailability	50%
Metabolism	Hepatic
Biological half-life	DHEA: 25 minutes DHEA-S: 11 hours
Excretion	Urine
- Except where otherwise noted, data are given for materials in their standard state (at 25 °C [77 °F], 100 kPa). verify (what is ?) Infobox references

Dehydroepiandrosterone (DHEA), also known as androstenolone, is an endogenous steroid hormone precursor. It is one of the most abundant circulating steroids in humans. DHEA is produced in the adrenal glands, the gonads, and the brain. It functions as a metabolic intermediate in the biosynthesis of the androgen and estrogen sex steroids both in the gonads and in various other tissues. However, DHEA also has a variety of potential biological effects in its own right, binding to an array of nuclear and cell surface receptors, and acting as a neurosteroid and modulator of neurotrophic factor receptors.

In the United States, DHEA is sold as an over-the-counter supplement, and medication called prasterone.

== Biological function ==
=== As an androgen ===
DHEA and other adrenal androgens such as androstenedione, although relatively weak androgens, are responsible for the androgenic effects of adrenarche, such as early pubic and axillary hair growth, adult-type body odor, increased oiliness of hair and skin, and mild acne. DHEA is potentiated locally via conversion into testosterone and dihydrotestosterone (DHT) in the skin and hair follicles. Women with complete androgen insensitivity syndrome (CAIS), who have a non-functional androgen receptor (AR) and are immune to the androgenic effects of DHEA and other androgens, have absent or only sparse/scanty pubic and axillary hair and body hair in general, demonstrating the role of DHEA and other androgens in body hair development at both adrenarche and pubarche.

=== As an estrogen ===
DHEA is a weak estrogen. In addition, it is transformed into potent estrogens such as estradiol in certain tissues such as the vagina, and thereby produces estrogenic effects in such tissues.

=== As a neurosteroid ===
As a neurosteroid and neurotrophin, DHEA has important effects in the central nervous system.

== Biological activity ==
=== Hormonal activity ===
==== Androgen receptor ====
Although it functions as an endogenous precursor to more potent androgens such as testosterone and DHT, DHEA has been found to possess some degree of androgenic activity in its own right, acting as a low affinity (K_{i} = 1 μM), weak partial agonist of the androgen receptor (AR). However, its intrinsic activity at the receptor is quite weak, and on account of that, due to competition for binding with full agonists like testosterone, it can actually behave more like an antagonist depending on circulating testosterone and dihydrotestosterone (DHT) levels, and hence, like an antiandrogen. However, its affinity for the receptor is very low, and for that reason, is unlikely to be of much significance under normal circumstances.

==== Estrogen receptors ====
In addition to its affinity for the androgen receptor, DHEA has also been found to bind to (and activate) the ERα and ERβ estrogen receptors with K_{i} values of 1.1 μM and 0.5 μM, respectively, and EC_{50} values of >1 μM and 200 nM, respectively. Though it was found to be a partial agonist of the ERα with a maximal efficacy of 30–70%, the concentrations required for this degree of activation make it unlikely that the activity of DHEA at this receptor is physiologically meaningful. Remarkably however, DHEA acts as a full agonist of the ERβ with a maximal response similar to or actually slightly greater than that of estradiol, and its levels in circulation and local tissues in the human body are high enough to activate the receptor to the same degree as that seen with circulating estradiol levels at somewhat higher than their maximal, non-ovulatory concentrations; indeed, when combined with estradiol with both at levels equivalent to those of their physiological concentrations, overall activation of the ERβ was doubled.

==== Other nuclear receptors ====
DHEA does not bind to or activate the progesterone, glucocorticoid, or mineralocorticoid receptors. Other nuclear receptor targets of DHEA besides the androgen and estrogen receptors include the PPARα, PXR, and CAR. However, whereas DHEA is a ligand of the PPARα and PXR in rodents, it is not in humans. In addition to direct interactions, DHEA is thought to regulate a handful of other proteins via indirect, genomic mechanisms, including the enzymes CYP2C11 and 11β-HSD1 – the latter of which is essential for the biosynthesis of the glucocorticoids such as cortisol and has been suggested to be involved in the antiglucocorticoid effects of DHEA – and the carrier protein IGFBP1.

=== Neurosteroid activity ===
==== Neurotransmitter receptors ====
DHEA has been found to directly act on several neurotransmitter receptors, including acting as a positive allosteric modulator of the NMDA receptor, as a negative allosteric modulator of the GABA_{A} receptor, and as an agonist of the σ_{1} receptor.

==== Neurotrophin receptors ====
In 2011, the surprising discovery was made that DHEA, as well as its sulfate ester, DHEA-S, directly bind to and activate TrkA and p75^{NTR}, receptors of neurotrophins like nerve growth factor (NGF) and brain-derived neurotrophic factor (BDNF), with high affinity. DHEA was subsequently also found to bind to TrkB and TrkC with high affinity, though it only activated TrkC not TrkB. DHEA and DHEA-S bound to these receptors with affinities in the low nanomolar range (around 5 nM), which were nonetheless approximately two orders of magnitude lower relative to highly potent polypeptide neurotrophins like NGF (0.01–0.1 nM). In any case, DHEA and DHEA-S both circulate at requisite concentrations to activate these receptors and were thus identified as important endogenous neurotrophic factors. They have since been labeled "steroidal microneurotrophins", due to their small-molecule and steroidal nature relative to their polypeptide neurotrophin counterparts. Subsequent research has suggested that DHEA and/or DHEA-S may in fact be phylogenetically ancient "ancestral" ligands of the neurotrophin receptors from early on in the evolution of the nervous system. The findings that DHEA binds to and potently activates neurotrophin receptors may explain the positive association between decreased circulating DHEA levels with age and age-related neurodegenerative diseases.

==== Microtubule-associated protein 2 ====
Similarly to pregnenolone, its synthetic derivative 3β-methoxypregnenolone (MAP-4343), and progesterone, DHEA has been found to bind to microtubule-associated protein 2 (MAP2), specifically the MAP2C subtype (K_{d} = 27 μM). However, it is unclear whether DHEA increases binding of MAP2 to tubulin like pregnenolone.

==== ADHD ====
Some research has shown that DHEA levels are too low in people with ADHD, and treatment with methylphenidate (NDRI stimulant) or bupropion (NDRI antidepressant) normalizes DHEA levels.

=== Other activity ===
==== G6PDH inhibitor ====
DHEA is an uncompetitive inhibitor of G6PDH (K_{i} = 17 μM; IC_{50} = 18.7 μM), and is able to lower NADPH levels and reduce NADPH-dependent free radical production. It is thought that this action may possibly be responsible for much of the antiinflammatory, antihyperplastic, chemopreventative, antihyperlipidemic, antidiabetic, and antiobesic, as well as certain immunomodulating activities of DHEA (with some experimental evidence to support this notion available). However, it has also been said that inhibition of G6PDH activity by DHEA in vivo has not been observed and that the concentrations required for DHEA to inhibit G6PDH in vitro are very high, thus making the possible contribution of G6PDH inhibition to the effects of DHEA uncertain.

==== Cancer ====
DHEA supplements have been promoted in supplement form for its claimed cancer prevention properties; there is no scientific evidence to support these claims.

==== Miscellaneous ====
DHEA has been found to competitively inhibit TRPV1.

== DHEA in regards to aging ==
DHEA levels peak in early adulthood and gradually decline with age. By supplementing with DHEA, some individuals aim to restore hormone levels, potentially improving energy levels, mood, and libido. DHEA can help improve bone density as it is related to androgens which is important for bone health. DHEA controls the production of osteoclasts and insulin like growth factor 1 (IGF-1) expression which strengthens bone growth through metabolites. This helps delay the risk of osteoporosis in early adults.

== Biochemistry ==
Comprehensive overview of steroidogenesis, showing DHEA at left among the androgens.

=== Biosynthesis ===
DHEA is produced in the zona reticularis of the adrenal cortex under the control of adrenocorticotropic hormone (ACTH) and by the gonads under the control of gonadotropin-releasing hormone (GnRH). It is also produced in the brain. DHEA is synthesized from cholesterol via the enzymes cholesterol side-chain cleavage enzyme (CYP11A1; P450scc) and 17α-hydroxylase/17,20-lyase (CYP17A1), with pregnenolone and 17α-hydroxypregnenolone as intermediates. It is derived mostly from the adrenal cortex, with only about 10% being secreted from the gonads. Approximately 50 to 70% of circulating DHEA originates from desulfation of DHEA-S in peripheral tissues. DHEA-S itself originates almost exclusively from the adrenal cortex, with 95 to 100% being secreted from the adrenal cortex in women.

==== Increasing endogenous production ====
Regular exercise is known to increase DHEA production in the body. Calorie restriction has also been shown to increase DHEA in primates. Some theorize that the increase in endogenous DHEA brought about by calorie restriction is partially responsible for the longer life expectancy known to be associated with calorie restriction.

=== Distribution ===
In the circulation, DHEA is mainly bound to albumin, with a small amount bound to sex hormone-binding globulin (SHBG). The small remainder of DHEA not associated with albumin or SHBG is unbound and free in the circulation.

DHEA easily crosses the blood–brain barrier into the central nervous system.

=== Metabolism ===
DHEA is transformed into DHEA-S by sulfation at the C3β position via the sulfotransferase enzymes SULT2A1 and to a lesser extent SULT1E1. This occurs naturally in the adrenal cortex and during first-pass metabolism in the liver and intestines when exogenous DHEA is administered orally. Levels of DHEA-S in circulation are approximately 250 to 300 times those of DHEA. DHEA-S in turn can be converted back into DHEA in peripheral tissues via steroid sulfatase (STS).

The terminal half-life of DHEA is short at only 15 to 30 minutes. In contrast, the terminal half-life of DHEA-S is far longer, at 7 to 10 hours. As DHEA-S can be converted back into DHEA, it serves as a circulating reservoir for DHEA, thereby extending the duration of DHEA.

Metabolites of DHEA include DHEA-S, 7α-hydroxy-DHEA, 7β-hydroxy-DHEA, 7-keto-DHEA, 7α-hydroxyepiandrosterone, and 7β-hydroxyepiandrosterone, as well as androstenediol and androstenedione.

==== Pregnancy ====
During pregnancy, DHEA-S is metabolized into the sulfates of 16α-hydroxy-DHEA and 15α-hydroxy-DHEA in the fetal liver as intermediates in the production of the estrogens estriol and estetrol, respectively.

=== Levels ===
Prior to puberty in humans, DHEA and DHEA-S levels elevate upon differentiation of the zona reticularis of the adrenal cortex. Peak levels of DHEA and DHEA-S are observed around age 20, which is followed by an age-dependent decline throughout life eventually back to prepubertal concentrations. Plasma levels of DHEA in adult men are 10 to 25 nM, in premenopausal women are 5 to 30 nM, and in postmenopausal women are 2 to 20 nM. Conversely, DHEA-S levels are an order of magnitude higher at 1–10 μM. Levels of DHEA and DHEA-S decline to the lower nanomolar and micromolar ranges in men and women aged 60 to 80 years.

DHEA levels are as follows:

- Adult men: 180–1250 ng/dL
- Adult women: 130–980 ng/dL
- Pregnant women: 135–810 ng/dL
- Prepubertal children (<1 year): 26–585 ng/dL
- Prepubertal children (1–5 years): 9–68 ng/dL
- Prepubertal children (6–12 years): 11–186 ng/dL
- Adolescent boys (Tanner II–III): 25–300 ng/dL
- Adolescent girls (Tanner II–III): 69–605 ng/dL
- Adolescent boys (Tanner IV–V): 100–400 ng/dL
- Adolescent girls (Tanner IV–V): 165–690 ng/dL

=== Measurement ===
As almost all DHEA is derived from the adrenal glands, blood measurements of DHEA-S/DHEA are useful to detect excess adrenal activity as seen in adrenal cancer or hyperplasia, including certain forms of congenital adrenal hyperplasia. Women with polyendocrine metabolic ovarian syndrome (PMOS) tend to have elevated levels of DHEA-S.

== Chemistry ==
DHEA, also known as androst-5-en-3β-ol-17-one, is a naturally occurring androstane steroid and a 17-ketosteroid. It is closely related structurally to androstenediol (androst-5-ene-3β,17β-diol), androstenedione (androst-4-ene-3,17-dione), and testosterone (androst-4-en-17β-ol-3-one). DHEA is the 5-dehydro analogue of epiandrosterone (5α-androstan-3β-ol-17-one) and is also known as 5-dehydroepiandrosterone or as δ^{5}-epiandrosterone.

=== Isomers ===
The term "dehydroepiandrosterone" is ambiguous chemically because it does not include the specific positions within epiandrosterone at which hydrogen atoms are missing. DHEA itself is 5,6-didehydroepiandrosterone or 5-dehydroepiandrosterone. A number of naturally occurring isomers also exist and may have similar activities. Some isomers of DHEA are 1-dehydroepiandrosterone (1-androsterone) and 4-dehydroepiandrosterone. These isomers are also technically "DHEA," since they are dehydroepiandrosterones in which hydrogens are removed from the epiandrosterone skeleton.

Dehydroandrosterone (DHA) is the 3α-epimer of DHEA and is also an endogenous androgen.

== History ==
DHEA was first isolated from human urine in 1934 by Adolf Butenandt and Kurt Tscherning.

== See also ==
- Epigenetic clock
