= List of withdrawn drugs =

Drugs or medicines may be withdrawn from commercial markets because of risks to patients, but also because of commercial reasons (e.g. lack of demand and relatively high production costs) or because it turns out that they are less effective in clinical practice than premarketing efficacy trials suggested. When risks or harms are the cause, withdrawals will usually have been prompted by unexpected adverse effects that were not detected during the early, premaketing, clinical trials, i.e. they became apparent only from postmarketing surveillance data collected from the wider community during routine use over longer periods of time.

This list is not limited to drugs that were ever approved by specific jurisdictions. Some of them (lumiracoxib, rimonabant, tolrestat, ximelagatran, and zimeldine, for example) received marketing approval in Europe but had not yet been approved for marketing in the United States when adverse effects became clear and they were withdrawn from the market. Some drugs in this list (e.g. LSD) were never approved for marketing in the United States or Europe.

== Significant withdrawals ==
Drug name (INNs where available)	Withdrawn	Country	Remarks
Amphetamine - mixture of four salts (Adderall XR)	2005	Canada	Withdrawn after reports of increased risk of stroke; reinstated after increased risk not found
Alatrofloxacin	2006	Worldwide	Serious hepatotoxicity leading to liver transplant or death
Alclofenac	1979	UK	Vasculitis
Alpidem (Ananxyl)	1995	Worldwide	Not approved in the US; withdrawn in France in 1994 and the rest of the world in 1995 because of rare but serious hepatotoxicity
Alosetron (Lotronex)	2000	US	Serious gastrointestinal adverse events; ischaemic colitis; severe constipation; reintroduced in 2002 with restricted indications and new controls
Alphaxolone/Alphadolone (Althesin)	1984	France, Germany, UK	Anaphylaxis, possibly due to the carrier oil (Cremophor EL)
Amineptine (Survector)	1999	France, US	Hepatotoxicity, dermatological adverse effects, and abuse potential
Aminophenazone (aminopyrine)	1999	France, Thailand	Risk of agranulocytosis and severe acne
Amobarbital	1980	Norway	Risk of barbiturate toxicity
Amoproxan	1970	France	Dermatological and ophthalmic toxicity
Anagestone acetate	1969	Germany	Animal carcinogenicity
Antrafenine	1984	France	Unspecific experimental toxicity
Aprotinin (Trasylol)	2008	US	Increased risk of death
Ardeparin (Normiflo)	2001	US	Withdrawn at the request of the NDA originator, "not for reason of safety or efficacy"
Astemizole (Hismanal)	1999	US, Malaysia, several nonspecified markets	Fatal arrhythmia
Azaribine	1976	US	Thromboembolism
Bendazac	1993	Spain	Hepatotoxicity
Benoxaprofen (Oraflex, Opren)	1982	Germany, Spain, UK, US	Liver and kidney failure; gastrointestinal bleeding; ulcers
Benzarone	1992	Germany	Hepatitis
Benzbromarone	2003	European Union, UK	Hepatotoxicity
Benziodarone	1964	France, UK	Jaundice
Beta-ethoxy-lacetanilanide	1986	Germany	Renal toxicity, animal carcinogenicity
Bezitramide	2004	Netherlands	Risk of fatal overdose
Bithionol	1967	US	Dermatological toxicity
Brotizolam	1989	UK	Animal carcinogenicity
Bromfenac	1998	US	Severe hepatitis and liver failure (requiring transplantation)
Bucetin	1986	Germany	Kidney damage
Buformin	1978	Germany	Metabolic toxicity
Bunamiodyl	1963	Canada, UK, US	Nephropathy
Butamben (Efocaine)(Butoforme)	1964	US	Dermatological toxicity; psychiatric reactions
Canrenone	1986	Germany	Animal carcinogenicity
Cerivastatin (Baycol, Lipobay)	2001	US	Risk of rhabdomyolysis
Chlormadinone (Chlormenadione)	1970	UK, US	Animal carcinogenicity
Chlormezanone (Trancopal)	1996	European Union, US, South Africa, Japan	Hepatotoxicity and Stevens–Johnson Syndrome
Chlorphentermine	1969	Germany	Cardiovascular toxicity
Cianidanol	1985	France, Germany, Spain, Sweden	Haemolytic anaemia
Cinepazide	1988	Spain	Agranulocytosis
Cisapride (Propulsid)	2000	US	Risk of fatal cardiac arrhythmias
Clioquinol	1973	France, Germany, UK, US	Neurotoxicity
Clobutinol	2007	Germany	Ventricular arrhythmias, QT-interval prolongation
Cloforex	1969	Germany	Cardiovascular toxicity
Clomacran	1982	UK	Hepatotoxicity
Clometacin	1987	France	Hepatotoxicity
Co-proxamol (paracetamol + dextropropoxyphene; Distalgesic®)	2004	UK	Risk of overdose
Cyclobarbital	1980	Norway	Risk of overdose
Cyclofenil	1987	France	Hepatotoxicity
Dantron	1963	Canada, UK, US	Mutagenic; withdrawn from general use in the UK but permitted in terminal patients
Dexfenfluramine	1997	European Union, UK, US	Cardiotoxic
Propoxyphene (Darvocet/Darvon)	2010	Worldwide	Increased risk of heart attacks and stroke
Diacetoxydiphenolisatin	1971	Australia	Hepatotoxicity
Diethylstilbestrol	1970s	US	Carcinogen
Difemerine	1986	Germany	Multi-organ toxicities
Dihydrostreptomycin	1970	US	Neuropsychiatric reactions
Dilevalol	1990	UK	Hepatotoxicity
Dimazole (Diamthazole)	1972	France, US	Neuropsychiatric reactions
Dimethylamylamine (DMAA)	1983	US	Voluntarily withdrawn from market by Lilly; reintroduced as a dietary supplement in 2006; in 2013 the FDA started work to ban it because of cardiovascular problems
Dinoprostone	1990	UK	Uterine hypotonus, fetal distress
Dipyrone (Metamizole)	1975	UK, US, others	Agranulocytosis, anaphylactic reactions
Dithiazanine iodide	1964	France, US	Cardiovascular and metabolic reactions
Dofetilide	2004	Germany	Drug-drug interactions, prolonged QT
Drotrecogin alfa (Xigris)	2011	Worldwide	Lack of efficacy as shown in the PROWESS-SHOCK study
Ebrotidine	1998	Spain	Hepatotoxicity
Efalizumab (Raptiva)	2009	Germany	Increased risk of progressive multifocal leukoencephalopathy
Encainide	1991	UK, US	Ventricular arrhythmias
Ethyl carbamate	1963	Canada, UK, US	Carcinogen
Etretinate	1989	France	Teratogen
Exifone	1989	France	Hepatotoxicity
Fen-phen (combination of fenfluramine + phentermine)	1997		Cardiotoxicity
Fenclofenac	1984	UK	Cutaneous reactions; animal carcinogenicity
Fenfluramine	1997	European Union, UK, US, India, South Africa, others	Cardiac valvular disease, pulmonary hypertension, cardiac fibrosis; re-approved in June 2020 for treatment of seizures associated with Dravet syndrome, under FDA orphan drug rules
Fenoterol	1990	New Zealand	Increased asthma mortality
Feprazone	1984	Germany, UK	Cutaneous reactions, multiorgan toxicity
Fipexide	1991	France	Hepatotoxicity
Flosequinan (Manoplax)	1993	UK, US	Increased mortality at higher doses; increased hospitalizations
Flunitrazepam	1991	France	Abuse
Flupirtine	2018	European Union	Liver toxicity
Gatifloxacin	2006	US	Increased risk of dysglycaemia
Gemtuzumab ozogamicin (Mylotarg)	2010	US	No improvement in clinical benefit; risk for death; returned to market in 2017
Glafenine	1984	France, Germany	Anaphylaxis
Grepafloxacin (Raxar)	1999	Germany, UK, US, others	Cardiac repolarization; QT interval prolongation
Hydromorphone (Palladone, extended release version)	2005		High risk of accidental overdose when extended release version (Palladone) administered with alcohol; standard hydromorphone is sold in most of the world, including the US
Ibufenac	1968	UK	Hepatotoxicity, jaundice
Indalpine	1985	France	Agranulocytosis
Indoprofen	1983	Germany, Spain, UK	Animal carcinogenicity, gastrointestinal toxicity
Ingenol mebutate gel	2020	Suspended in Europe	Increased risk of skin cancers
Iodinated casein strophantin	1964	US	Metabolic reactions
Iproniazid	1964	Canada	Interactions with food products containing tyrosine
Isaxonine phosphate	1984	France	Hepatotoxicity
Isoxicam	1983	France, Germany, Spain, others	Stevens–Johnson syndrome
Kava kava (Piper methysticum)	2002	Germany	Hepatotoxicity
Ketorolac	1993	France, Germany, others	Haemorrhage, Kidney Failure
L-tryptophan	1989	Germany, UK	Eosinophilic myalgia syndrome; still sold in the US
Levamisole (Ergamisol)	1999	US	Still used as veterinary drug and as a human antihelminthic in many markets; listed on the WHO's List of Essential Medicines; in humans, it was used to treat melanoma before it was withdrawn because of agranulocytosis
Levomethadyl acetate	2003	US	Cardiac arrhythmias and cardiac arrest
Lorcaserin (Belviq)	2020	US	Increased risk of cancer
Lumiracoxib (Prexige)	2007–2008	Worldwide	Liver damage
Lysergic acid diethylamide (LSD)	1950s–1960s		Marketed as a psychiatric drug; withdrawn after it became widely used recreationally; now illegal in most of the world
Mebanazine	1975	UK	Hepatotoxicity, drug-drug interactions
Methandrostenolone	1982	France, Germany, UK, US, others	Off-label abuse
Methapyrilene	1979	Germany, UK, US	Animal carcinogenicity
Methaqualone	1984	South Africa (1971), India (1984), United Nations (1971–1988)	Withdrawn because of risk of addiction and overdose
Metipranolol	1990	UK, others	Uveitis
Metofoline	1965	US	Unspecific experimental toxicity
Mibefradil	1998	European Union, Malaysia, US, others	Fatal arrhythmias, drug-drug interactions
Minaprine	1996	France	Convulsions
Moxisylyte	1993	France	Necrotic hepatitis
Muzolimine	1987	France, Germany, European Union	Polyneuropathy
Natalizumab (Tysabri)	2005–2006	US	Voluntarily withdrawn from the US market because of a risk of Progressive multifocal leukoencephalopathy (PML); returned to the market in July 2006
Nefazodone	2004	Europe, Australia, New Zealand, Canada	Branded version withdrawn by the originator in several countries in 2007 because of hepatotoxicity; generic versions available; still available in the US
Nialamide	1974	UK, US	Hepatotoxicity, drug -drug interactions
Nikethamide	1988	Multiple markets	CNS stimulation
Nitrefazole	1984	Germany	Hepatic and haematological toxicity
Nomifensine	1981–1986	France, Germany, Spain, UK, US, others	Haemolytic anaemia, hepatotoxicity, serious hypersensitivity reactions
Oxeladin	1976	Canada, UK, US (1976)	Carcinogen
Oxyphenbutazone	1984–1985	UK, US, Germany, France, Canada	Bone marrow suppression, Stevens–Johnson syndrome
Oxyphenisatin (Phenisatin)	1970s	Australia, France, Germany, UK, US	Hepatotoxicity
Ozogamicin	2010	US	No improvement in clinical benefit; risk of death; veno-occlusive disease
Pemoline (Cylert)	1997	Canada, UK	Withdrawn in the US in 2005 because of hepatotoxicity
Pentobarbital	1980	Norway	Risk of fatal overdose
Pentylenetetrazol	1982	US	Withdrawn because of inability to produce effective convulsive therapy, and because it caused seizures
Pergolide (Permax)	2007	US	Risk of heart valve damage
Perhexiline	1985	UK, Spain	Neurological and hepatic toxicity
Phenacetin	1975	Canada	An ingredient in "APC" tablets (aspirin + phenacetin + caffeine); withdrawn because of risks of cancer and kidney disease in Germany, Denmark, UK, US, and in others because of nephropathy
Phenformin and Buformin	1977	France, Germany, US	Severe lactic acidosis
Phenolphthalein	1997	US	Possible carcinogen
Phenoxypropazine	1966	UK	Hepatotoxicity, drug-drug interactions
Phenylbutazone	1985	Germany	Off-label abuse, haematological toxicity
Phenylpropanolamine (Propagest, Dexatrim)	2000	Canada, US	Haemorrhagic stroke
Pifoxime (=Pixifenide)	1976	France	Neuropsychiatric reactions
Pirprofen	1990	France, Germany, Spain	Liver toxicity.
Prenylamine	1988	Canada, France, Germany, UK, US, others	Cardiac arrhythmias and death
Proglumide	1989	Germany	Respiratory reactions
Pronethalol	1965	UK	Animal carcinogenicity
Propanidid	1983	UK	Allergy
Proxibarbal	1998	Spain, France, Italy, Portugal, Turkey	Immunoallergic, thrombocytopenia
Pyrovalerone	1979	France	Abuse
Ranitidine (Zantac)	2020	Worldwide	Found to spontaneously break down into the carcinogen N-nitrosodimethylamine
Rapacuronium (Raplon)	2001	US, multiple markets	Withdrawn in many countries because of the risk of fatal bronchospasm
Remoxipride	1993	UK, others	Aplastic anaemia
Rhesus rotavirus vaccine-tetravalent (RotaShield)	1999	US	Withdrawn because of a risk of intussusception
Rimonabant (Acomplia)	2008	Worldwide	Risk of severe depression and suicide
Rofecoxib (Vioxx)	2004	Worldwide	Withdrawn by Merck & Co. because of the risks of myocardial infarction and stroke
Rosiglitazone (Avandia)	2010	Europe	Risk of heart attacks and death; still available in the US
Secobarbital	1990	France, Norway, others	Risk of overdose
Sertindole	1998	European Union	Arrhythmias and sudden cardiac death
Sibutramine (Reductil/Meridia)	2010	Australia, Canada, China, the European Union (EU), Hong Kong, India, Mexico, New Zealand, the Philippines, Thailand, the United Kingdom, US	Increased risk of heart attack and stroke
Sitaxentan	2010	Germany	Hepatotoxicity
Sorivudine	1993	Japan	Drug-drug interactions and deaths
Sparfloxacin	2001	US	QT interval prolongation and phototoxicity
Sulfacarbamide	1988	Germany	Dermatological, hematological, and hepatic reactions
Sulfamethoxydiazine	1988	Germany	Dermatological reactions
Sulfamethoxypyridazine	1986	UK	Dermatological and haematological reactions
Suloctidil	1985	Germany, France, Spain	Hepatotoxicity
Suprofen	1986–1987	UK, Spain, US	Kidney damage
Tegaserod (Zelnorm)	2007	US	Risks of heart attack, stroke, and unstable angina; was available through a restricted access programme until April 2008; returned to the market in 2019
Temafloxacin	1992	Germany, UK, US, others	Low blood sugar; haemolytic anaemia; kidney, liver dysfunction; allergic reactions
Temafloxacin	1992	US	Allergic reactions and cases of haemolytic anaemia, leading to three deaths
Temazepam (Restoril, Euhypnos, Normison, Remestan, Tenox, Norkotral)	1999	Sweden, Norway	Diversion, abuse, and a relatively high rate of overdose deaths compared with other drugs of its group; it is still available in most of the world, including the US, but under strict controls
Terfenadine (Seldane, Triludan)	1997–1998	France, South Africa, Oman, US, others	Prolonged QT interval; ventricular tachycardia
Terodiline (Micturin)	1991	Germany, UK, Spain, others	Prolonged QT interval, ventricular tachycardia, and other arrhythmias
Tetrazepam	2013	European Union	Serious cutaneous reactions
Thalidomide	1961	Germany	Withdrawn because of risk of teratogenicity; returned to the market for use in leprosy and multiple myeloma under FDA orphan drug rules
Thenalidine	1963	Canada, UK, US	Neutropenia
Thiobutabarbital	1993	Germany	Kidney damage
Thioridazine (Melleril)	2005	Germany, UK	Withdrawn worldwide because of severe cardiac arrhythmias; still available in Russia
Ticrynafen (Tienilic acid)	1980	Germany, France, UK, US, others	Liver toxicity and death
Tolcapone (Tasmar)	1998	European Union, Canada, Australia	Hepatotoxicity
Tolrestat (Alredase)	1996	Argentina, Canada, Italy, others	Severe hepatotoxicity
Triacetyldiphenolisatin	1971	Australia	Hepatotoxicity
Triazolam	1991	France, Netherlands, Finland, Argentina, UK, others	Psychiatric adverse drug reactions, amnesia
Triparanol	1962	France, US	Cataracts, alopecia, ichthyosis
Troglitazone (Rezulin)	2000	Germany, US	Hepatotoxicity
Trovafloxacin (Trovan)	1999–2001	European Union, US	Withdrawn because of risk of liver failure
Valdecoxib (Bextra)	2004	US	Risk of heart attack and stroke
Vincamine	1987	Germany	Haematological toxicity
Voxelotor (Oxbryta)	2024	Worldwide	Heightened risk of vaso-occlusive crisis
Xenazoic acid	1965	France	Hepatotoxicity
Ximelagatran (Exanta)	2006	Germany	Hepatotoxicity
Zimeldine	1983	Worldwide	Risk of Guillain–Barré syndrome, hypersensitivity reactions, hepatotoxicity; banned worldwide.
Zomepirac	1983	UK, Germany, Spain, US	Anaphylactic reactions and non-fatal allergic reactions; kidney failure

== See also ==
- Adverse drug reaction
- Adverse events
- European Medicines Agency
- Food and Drug Administration
