= Hydroxypregnanedione =

Hydroxypregnanedione may refer to:

- Alfaxalone (3α-hydroxy-5α-pregnane-11,20-dione)
- Hydroxydione (21-hydroxy-5β-pregnane-3,20-dione)
- Renanolone (3α-hydroxy-5β-pregnane-11,20-dione)

== See also ==
- Progesterone
- Hydroxyprogesterone
- Pregnanolone
- Pregnanedione
- Pregnanediol
- Pregnanetriol
- Dihydroprogesterone
