= Étienne-Émile Baulieu =

French biochemist and endocrinologist (1926–2025)

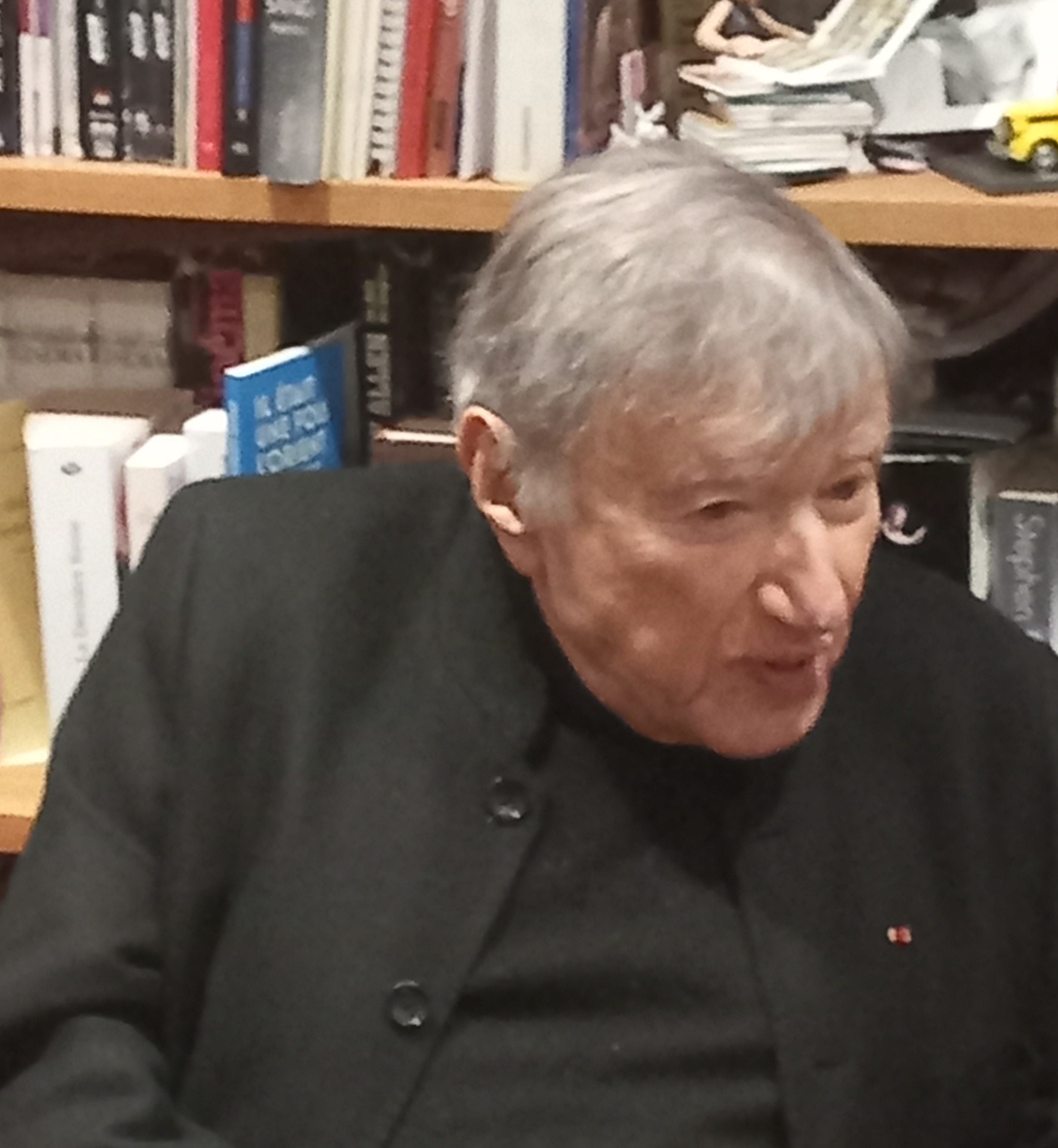
- Baulieu in 2023
- Born: 12 December 1926; Strasbourg, France
- Died: 30 May 2025 (aged 98); Paris, France
- Known for: RU-486; DHEA; Neurosteroids
- Scientific career
- Fields: Endocrinology
- Workplaces: INSERM

Étienne-Émile Baulieu (French: [etjɛn emil boljø]; 12 December 1926 – 30 May 2025) was a French biochemist and endocrinologist who was best known for his research in the field of steroid hormones and their role in reproduction and aging. He has been nicknamed the “father” of the abortion pill mainly as a result of his work on the abortion-inducing drug RU486 (Mifepristone). Baulieu also worked to determine if dehydroepiandrosterone (DHEA) was a prohormone and if it and other hormonal substitutions also increased longevity in humans.

== Early life and education ==
Baulieu was born Émile Blum to Jewish parents in Strasbourg, France, on 12 December 1926. His father, who died when Baulieu was four, was Léon Blum, a physician and an early specialist in diabetes. Baulieu changed his name during World War II when his family fled to the area near Grenoble and he engaged in the French resistance. After the war, he attended the Faculté de Médecine de Paris and became a physician in 1955. He studied further under his mentor Max Fernand Jayle (1913–1978) in the field of steroid hormones and obtained his PhD in 1963 at the Faculté de Médecine and Faculté des Sciences in Paris.

== Career ==
In 1963 Baulieu was named a research director (equivalent to a research full professor) at INSERM, and in 1970 he became a professor of Biochemistry at the Faculty of Medicine of Bicêtre, affiliated with University of Paris-South. Since 2004, Baulieu was a member of the French "Ethical Advisory Committee" (Comité Consultatif National d'Ethique) for science and health. He was also associated with the "Institute of Longevity and Aging" (L'Institut de la longévité, des vieillesses et du vieillissement). In 2008, he started the Institut Baulieu, a research program to study and treat neurodegenerative diseases, and foster research into healthy longevity.

He served as president of the French Academy of Sciences and as a member of the United States' National Academy of Sciences.

=== Research ===
Baulieu had an ongoing interest in dehydroepiandrosterone (DHEA). In 1960 he demonstrated that DHEA was the main adrenal androgen, was largely conjugated as a hydrophilic sulfate, and described its metabolism and functions. He worked to uncover the production of estrogens by the placenta during pregnancy and this led to the concept of DHEA being a "prohormone". Upon the invitation of Seymour Lieberman, Baulieu became a visiting scientist at Columbia University in 1961–1962, and during this time he met Gregory Pincus, the father of the "birth control pill". Baulieu then turned to more studies in contraception and in the regulation of fertility and pregnancy. He became a pioneer in the description of intracellular sex steroid receptors and identified major intracellular participants such as the heat shock proteins. He worked on the progesterone receptor and androgen receptor. While steroid receptors are generally found within the cell, Baulieu identified a membrane receptor for a steroid hormone in Xenopus laevis.

==== Neurosteroids ====
Beginning in the late 1970s, Baulieu and Paul Robel with collaborators investigated the presence and metabolism of steroid hormones in the central nervous system. In a series of studies published between 1978 and 1981, they demonstrated that pregnenolone, dehydroepiandrosterone (DHEA), and related steroids are synthesized de novo in the brain, independently of peripheral endocrine glands. In 1981 Baulieu introduced the term “neurosteroids” to describe these endogenously produced steroids with potential neuromodulatory actions. During the early 1980s Baulieu’s group catalogued the distribution of neurosteroids in different brain regions and documented their variation across age, stress, and physiological states. At that time Baulieu emphasized that, although neurosteroids were clearly present in the nervous system, their physiological function remained unknown.

A major advance occurred in 1986, when Majewska, Harrison, and others reported that allopregnanolone and related neurosteroids are potent positive modulators of the GABAA receptor. This work provided the first molecular mechanism for neurosteroid action and established a direct link between Baulieu’s discovery of brain-derived steroids and inhibitory neurotransmission. Subsequent studies throughout the late 1980s and 1990s expanded the concept of neurosteroid modulation of GABAergic signaling and its relevance to stress, anxiety, seizure susceptibility, and mood regulation.

Baulieu continued to investigate the physiological and clinical significance of DHEA, pregnenolone, and their sulfate esters, including studies on aging, cognition, neuroprotection, and mood. In his 1997 reviews Baulieu summarized the state of knowledge regarding neuroactive neurosteroids.

In the early 21st century, the neurosteroid field developed into a translational research area in neuropsychopharmacology. Synthetic analogues of endogenous neurosteroids were developed as therapeutic agents, including ganaxolone for seizure disorders and zuranolone for postpartum depression and major depressive disorder. Additional neurosteroid-based or neurosteroid-inspired modulators of GABAA receptors have been explored in preclinical and clinical research.

==== RU486 ====
Baulieu was known worldwide for his work on RU486 (Mifepristone) and has been termed the "father" of the abortion pill. Baulieu, who had identified the progesterone receptor, suggested to Roussel-Uclaf to modify the progesterone molecule to create an anti-progesterone. Georges Teutsch then synthesized an agent that became initially known as RU486 in 1980. Baulieu investigated the actions of this agent as an anti-progesterone steroid that proved to be able to induce early abortion, and became more effective in conjunction with misoprostol. As a proponent of a nonsurgical approach to abortion, Baulieu became an advocate for RU486 even when the company withdrew from the product and propelled him into the limelight of the abortion debate. As an anti-progesterone, RU486 also has other potential such as in the treatment of certain conditions (breast cancer, brain cancer, endometriosis, diabetes, hypertension), and the anti-cortisol activity he discovered may be useful to manage depression or Cushing's syndrome.

==== Longevity ====
Baulieu took increasing interest in what he called the "longevity revolution", that people are living longer, and its implications. As part of this, he investigated the potential of hormonal substitution such as DHEA to increase well-being in old age. The "Institute Baulieu" was started in 2008 to address issues that are detrimental to health in older people. One focus of research in the 2020s is finding ways to decrease the problems of the elderly to function independently.

== Death ==
Baulieu died at his home in Paris, on 30 May 2025, at the age of 98.

== Honours and awards ==
- 1967 Chevalier of the Ordre national du Mérite
- 1982 French Academy of Sciences, President, 2003–04
- 1989 Albert Lasker Award for Clinical Medical Research
- 1990 National Academy of Sciences
- 1990 Grand Officer of the Légion d'honneur
- 1990 Golden Plate Award of the American Academy of Achievement
- 2002 French Academy of Medicine
- 2023, Grand Cross of the Legion of Honor

== Bibliography ==
- Baulieu EE, Kelly PA (1990). Hormones: From Molecules to Disease. Springer. ISBN 0-412-02791-7.
- Baulieu EE (1990). Etienne-Émile Baulieu (in French). Paris: Génération Pilule. ISBN 978-2738100719. Autobiography.
- Baulieu EE (1991). Abortion Pill. Simon & Schuster. ISBN 0-671-73816-X.
- Baulieu EE (1999). Neurosteroids: A New Regulatory Function in the Nervous System. Humana Press. ISBN 0-89603-545-X.
