= Minaxolone =

Chemical compound

Clinical data
- Other names: 11α-(Dimethylamino)-2β-ethoxy-3α-hydroxy-5α-pregnan-20-one
- ATC code: none

Identifiers
- IUPAC name: 1-[(1S,2S,4S,5S,7S,10S,11S,14S,15S,17R)-17-(dimethylamino)-4-ethoxy-5-hydroxy-2,15-dimethyltetracyclo[8.7.0.0^{2,7}.0^{11,15}]heptadecan-14-yl]ethan-1-one
- CAS Number: 62571-87-3
- PubChem CID: 71960
- IUPHAR/BPS: 5478
- ChemSpider: 64967
- UNII: 737SKC73L0
- KEGG: D05041
- ChEMBL: ChEMBL2105209
- CompTox Dashboard (EPA): DTXSID201024283

Chemical and physical data
- Formula: C_{25}H_{43}NO_{3}
- Molar mass: 405.623 g·mol^{−1}
- 3D model (JSmol): Interactive image
- SMILES: CCO[C@H]1C[C@]2([C@@H](CC[C@@H]3[C@@H]2[C@@H](C[C@]4([C@H]3CC[C@@H]4C(=O)C)C)N(C)C)C[C@@H]1O)C
- InChI: InChI=1S/C25H43NO3/c1-7-29-22-14-24(3)16(12-21(22)28)8-9-17-19-11-10-18(15(2)27)25(19,4)13-20(23(17)24)26(5)6/h16-23,28H,7-14H2,1-6H3/t16-,17-,18+,19-,20+,21-,22-,23+,24-,25+/m0/s1; Key:NCGLTZSBTFVVAW-KNXRZYMVSA-N

Minaxolone (CCI-12923) is a neuroactive steroid which was developed as a general anesthetic but was withdrawn before registration due to toxicity seen with long-term administration in rats, and hence was never marketed. It is a positive allosteric modulator of the GABA_{A} receptor, as well as, less potently, a positive allosteric modulator of the glycine receptor.

== See also ==
- Alfadolone
- Alfaxolone
- Ganaxolone
- Hydroxydione
- Pregnanolone
- Renanolone
