= Alfadolone =

Chemical compound

Clinical data
- Other names: 3α,21-dihydroxy-5α-pregnane-11,20-dione
- Routes of administration: Intravenous
- ATC code: none

Identifiers
- IUPAC name: (3R,5S,9S,14S)-3-hydroxy-17-(2-hydroxyacetyl)-10,13-dimethyl-1,2,3,4,5,6,7,8,9,12,14,15,16,17-tetradecahydrocyclopenta[a]phenanthren-11-one
- CAS Number: 14107-37-0
- PubChem CID: 71680
- ChemSpider: 7974182
- UNII: OE1C96974E
- ChEMBL: ChEMBL2104019
- CompTox Dashboard (EPA): DTXSID501016382
- ECHA InfoCard: 100.034.496

Chemical and physical data
- Formula: C_{21}H_{32}O_{4}
- Molar mass: 348.483 g·mol^{−1}
- 3D model (JSmol): Interactive image
- SMILES: O=C2[C@H]3[C@H]([C@@H]1CC[C@H](C(=O)CO)[C@@]1(C)C2)CC[C@H]4C[C@H](O)CC[C@]34C
- InChI: InChI=1S/C21H32O4/c1-20-8-7-13(23)9-12(20)3-4-14-15-5-6-16(18(25)11-22)21(15,2)10-17(24)19(14)20/h12-16,19,22-23H,3-11H2,1-2H3/t12-,13+,14-,15-,16+,19+,20-,21-/m0/s1; Key:XWYBFXIUISNTQG-VKMGZQQJSA-N

Alfadolone (INN), or alphadolone is a neuroactive steroid and general anesthetic. Along with alfaxolone, as alfadolone acetate, it is one of the components of the anesthetic drug mixture althesin.

== See also ==
- Ganaxolone
- Hydroxydione
- Minaxolone
- Pregnanolone
- Renanolone
