= Propanidid =

Chemical compound

Clinical data
- Trade names: Epontol
- AHFS/Drugs.com: International Drug Names
- ATC code: N01AX04 (WHO)

Legal status
- Legal status: BR: Class C1 (Other controlled substances)

Identifiers
- IUPAC name: Propyl {4-[2-(diethylamino)-2-oxoethoxy]-3-methoxyphenyl}acetate
- CAS Number: 1421-14-3
- PubChem CID: 15004
- DrugBank: DB13234
- ChemSpider: 14283
- UNII: AO82L471NS
- KEGG: D05626
- ChEBI: CHEBI:135432
- ChEMBL: ChEMBL2105345
- CompTox Dashboard (EPA): DTXSID7048825
- ECHA InfoCard: 100.014.384

Chemical and physical data
- Formula: C_{18}H_{27}NO_{5}
- Molar mass: 337.416 g·mol^{−1}
- 3D model (JSmol): Interactive image
- SMILES: O=C(OCCC)Cc1cc(OC)c(OCC(=O)N(CC)CC)cc1
- InChI: InChI=1S/C18H27NO5/c1-5-10-23-18(21)12-14-8-9-15(16(11-14)22-4)24-13-17(20)19(6-2)7-3/h8-9,11H,5-7,10,12-13H2,1-4H3; Key:KEJXLQUPYHWCNM-UHFFFAOYSA-N

Propanidid is an ultra short-acting phenylacetate general anesthetic. It was originally introduced by Bayer in 1963 but anaphylactic reactions caused it to be withdrawn shortly afterwards.

The cause of the anaphylaxis has not been determined. Similar to Althesin, Cremophor EL was used as part of the formulation for propanidid. Cremephor EL has been shown to cause anaphylactic reactions in humans in several cases (both when given intravenously and orally), and several negative reactions have been recorded for drugs using Cremephor EL. However, some have argued that the anaphylaxis was a reaction to propanidid itself.

== See also ==
- AZD-3043
