= C19H29NO5 =

The molecular formula C_{19}H_{29}NO_{5} (molar mass: 351.43 g/mol) may refer to:

- Dipivefrine
- AZD-3043
