= Renanolone =

Chemical compound

Clinical data
- ATC code: none

Identifiers
- IUPAC name: 3α-hydroxy-5β-pregnane-11,20-dione
- CAS Number: 565-99-1
- PubChem CID: 68930
- ChemSpider: 62156
- UNII: D8Z6E4IR2J
- CompTox Dashboard (EPA): DTXSID101024028

Chemical and physical data
- Formula: C_{21}H_{32}O_{3}
- Molar mass: 332.484 g·mol^{−1}
- 3D model (JSmol): Interactive image
- SMILES: CC(=O)[C@H]1CC[C@@H]2[C@@]1(CC(=O)[C@H]3[C@H]2CC[C@H]4[C@@]3(CC[C@H](C4)O)C)C
- InChI: InChI=1S/C21H32O3/c1-12(22)16-6-7-17-15-5-4-13-10-14(23)8-9-20(13,2)19(15)18(24)11-21(16,17)3/h13-17,19,23H,4-11H2,1-3H3/t13-,14-,15+,16-,17+,19-,20+,21-/m1/s1; Key:DUHUCHOQIDJXAT-CSXWOMMHSA-N

Renanolone (INN; also known as 11-ketopregnanolone or 5β-pregnan-3α-ol-11,20-dione) is a synthetic neuroactive steroid which is described as a general anesthetic, but was never introduced for clinical use. Its isomers, alfaxolone and alfadolone, are also general anesthetics, and are known to act as positive allosteric modulators of the GABA_{A} receptor, a property which is likely the case for renanolone as well.

== See also ==
- Alfadolone
- Alfaxolone
- Ganaxolone
- Hydroxydione
- Minaxolone
- Pregnanolone
