= Alfaxalone =

Chemical compound

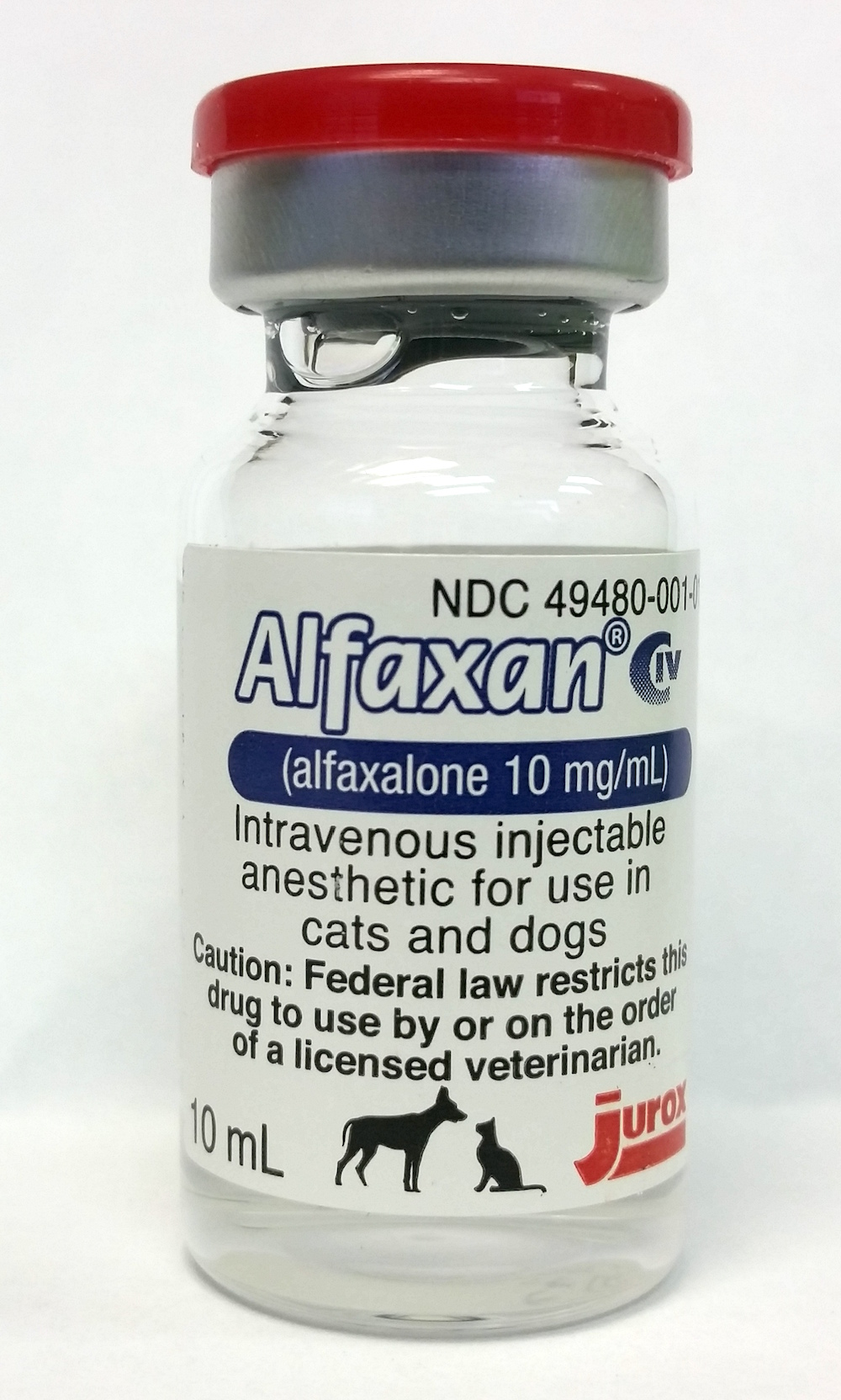

Clinical data
- Trade names: Alfaxan
- Other names: Alphaxalone; Alphaxolone; Alfaxolone; 3α-Hydroxy-5α-pregnane-11,20-dione; PHAX-001; Phaxan, Alphaxalone (BAN UK)
- AHFS/Drugs.com: International Drug Names
- License data: US DailyMed: Alfaxan
- Drug class: Neuroactive steroid; General anesthetic
- ATCvet code: QN01AX05 (WHO)

Legal status
- Legal status: AU: S4 (Prescription only); CA: ℞-only; US: Schedule IV (by veterinarian only)

Pharmacokinetic data
- Protein binding: 30–50%
- Metabolism: Hepatic
- Metabolites: Alfaxalone glucuronide (major in dogs); 20-Hydroxyalfaxalone sulfate (major in cats)
- Elimination half-life: 25 min (dogs); 45 min (cats)
- Excretion: Mostly renal

Identifiers
- IUPAC name: (3R,5S,8S,9S,10S,13S,14S,17S)-17-acetyl-3-hydroxy-10,13-dimethyl-1,2,3,4,5,6,7,8,9,12,14,15,16,17-tetradecahydrocyclopenta[a]phenanthren-11-one
- CAS Number: 23930-19-0
- PubChem CID: 104845
- IUPHAR/BPS: 5461
- DrugBank: DB11371
- ChemSpider: 94637
- UNII: BD07M97B2A
- KEGG: D07282
- ChEMBL: ChEMBL190279
- CompTox Dashboard (EPA): DTXSID9022576
- ECHA InfoCard: 100.164.405

Chemical and physical data
- Formula: C_{21}H_{32}O_{3}
- Molar mass: 332.484 g·mol^{−1}
- 3D model (JSmol): Interactive image
- SMILES: O=C2[C@H]3[C@H]([C@@H]1CC[C@H](C(=O)C)[C@@]1(C)C2)CC[C@H]4C[C@H](O)CC[C@]34C
- InChI: InChI=1S/C21H32O3/c1-12(22)16-6-7-17-15-5-4-13-10-14(23)8-9-20(13,2)19(15)18(24)11-21(16,17)3/h13-17,19,23H,4-11H2,1-3H3/t13-,14+,15-,16+,17-,19+,20-,21+/m0/s1; Key:DUHUCHOQIDJXAT-OLVMNOGESA-N

Alfaxalone, also known as alphaxalone or alphaxolone and sold under the brand name Alfaxan and Faxone, is a neuroactive steroid and general anesthetic which is used currently in veterinary practice as an induction agent for anesthesia and as an injectable anesthetic. The most common side effect seen in current veterinary practice is respiratory depression when Alfaxan is administered concurrently with other sedative and anesthetic drugs; when premedications are not given, veterinary patients also become agitated and hypersensitive when waking up.

Alfaxalone works as a positive allosteric modulator on GABA_{A} receptors and, at high concentrations, as a direct agonist of the GABA_{A} receptor. It is cleared quickly by the liver, giving it a relatively short terminal half-life and preventing it from accumulating in the body, lowering the chance of overdose.

== Veterinary use ==
Alfaxalone is used as an induction agent, an injectable anesthetic, and a sedative in animals. While it is commonly used in cats and dogs, it has also been successfully used in rabbits, horses, sheep, pigs, and exotics such as red-eared turtles, axolotl, green iguanas, marmosets, and koi fish. As an induction agent, alfaxalone causes the animal to relax enough to be intubated, which then allows the administration of inhalational anesthesia. Premedication (administering sedative drugs prior to induction) reduces the required induction dose of alfaxalone. Alfaxalone can be used for total intravenous anesthesia; this is especially useful in airway procedures such as bronchoscopy to avoid exposing the clinician to volatile anesthetic. Once the administration of alfaxalone stops, the animal quickly recovers from anesthesia.

Alfaxalone can be used for intramuscular (IM) sedation, although higher doses may be precluded by the relatively large volume required.

Despite its use as an anesthetic, alfaxalone itself has no analgesic properties.

=== Available forms ===
Though alfaxalone is not licensed for IM or subcutaneous use in the United States (as both cause longer recoveries with greater agitation and hypersensitivity to stimuli), it is routinely used IM in cats, and is licensed as such in other countries.

Alfaxalone is dissolved in 2-hydroxypropyl-β cyclodextrin. The cyclodextrin is a large, starch-derived molecule with a hydrophobic core where alfaxalone stays, allowing the mixture to be dissolved in water and sold as an aqueous solution. They act as one unit, and only dissociate once in vivo.

== Specific populations ==
Alfaxalone has been used to perform C-sections in pregnant cats; though it crosses the placental barrier and had some effects on the kittens, there is no respiratory depression and no lasting effect. Alfaxalone has also been found to be safe in young puppies and kittens.

Alfaxalone has been noted to be a good anesthetic agent for dogs with ventricular arrhythmias and for sighthounds.

There seems to be marked difference in sex response: anaesthesia in the male rat requires about four times more than in the female.

== Side effects ==
The most common side effect of alfaxalone is respiratory depression: in addition to apnea, the most prevalent, alfaxalone can also decrease the respiratory rate, minute volume, and oxygen saturation in the blood. Alfaxalone should be administered slowly over a period of at least 60 seconds or until anesthesia is induced, as quick administration increases the risk of apnea. Alfaxalone has some depressive effects on the central nervous system, including a reduction in cerebral blood flow, intracranial pressure, and body temperature.

Greyhounds, who are particularly susceptible to anesthetic side effects, can have decreased blood flow and oxygen supply to the liver.

When no premedications are used, alfaxalone causes animals (especially cats) to be agitated when recovering. Dogs and cats will paddle in the air, vocalize excessively, may remain rigid or twitch, and have exaggerated reactions to external stimuli such as light and noise. For this reason, it is recommended that animals recovering from anesthesia by alfaxalone stay in a quiet, dark area.

== Overdose ==
The quick metabolism and elimination of alfaxalone from the body decreases the chance of overdose. It would take over 28 times the normal dose to cause toxicity in cats. Such doses, however, can cause low blood pressure, apnea, hypoxia, and arrhythmia (caused by the apnea and hypoxia).

== Pharmacology ==
=== Pharmacodynamics ===
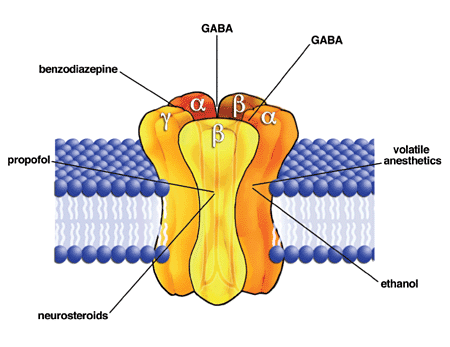
GABA_{A} receptor and the location of various ligand-binding sites.

Alfaxalone is a neuroactive steroid derived from progesterone, though it has no glucocorticoid or mineralocorticoid action. Instead, it works by acting on GABA_{A} receptors. It binds to the M3/M4 domains of the α subunit and allosterically modifies the receptor to facilitate the movement of chloride ions into the cell, resulting in hyperpolarization of the post-synaptic nerve (which inhibits actions potentials). At concentrations over 1 micromolar, alfaxalone binds to a site at the interface between the α and β subunits (near the actual GABA binding site) and acts as a GABA agonist, similar to benzodiazepines. Alfaxalone, however, does not share the benzodiazepine binding site, and actually prefers different GABA_{A} receptors than benzodiazepines do. It works best on the α1-β2-γ2-L isoform. Research suggests that neuroactive steroids increase the expression of GABA_{A} receptors, making it more difficult to build tolerance.

=== Pharmacokinetics ===
Alfaxalone is metabolized quickly and does not accumulate in the body; its use as an induction agent thus doesn't increase the time needed to recover from anesthesia. If it administered more slowly by diluting it in sterile water, less actual alfaxalone is needed. Alfaxalone binds to 30–50% of plasma proteins, and has a terminal half-life of 25 minutes in dogs and 45 minutes in cats when given at clinical doses (2 mg/kg and 5 mg/kg respectively). The pharmacokinetics are nonlinear in cats and dogs.

Most alfaxalone metabolism takes place in the liver, though some takes place in the lungs and kidneys as well. In the liver, it undergoes both phase I (cytochrome P450-dependent) and phase II (conjugation-dependent) metabolism. The phase I products are the same in cats and dogs: allopregnatrione, 3β-alfaxalone, 20-hydroxy-3β-alfaxalone, 2-hydroxyalfaxalone, and 2α-hydroxyalfaxalone. In dogs, the phase II metabolites are alfaxalone glucuronide (the major metabolite), 20-hydroxyalfaxalone sulfate, and 2α-hydroxyalfaxalone glucuronide. In cats, there is a greater production of 20-hydroxyalfaxalone sulfate than alfaxalone glucuronide; cats also have 3β-alfaxalone-sulfate, which is not present in dogs.

Alfaxalone is mostly excreted in the urine, though some is excreted in the bile as well.

== Chemistry ==
Progesterone (left) and its derivative, alfaxolan (right); the differences are highlighted in pink.

Alfaxalone, also known as 11-oxo-3α,5α-tetrahydroprogesterone, 5α-pregnan-3α-ol-11,20-dione, or 3α-hydroxy-5α-pregnane-11,20-dione, is a synthetic pregnane steroid and a derivative of progesterone. It is specifically a modification of progesterone in which the C3 ketone has been reduced to a hydroxyl group, the double bond between the C4 and C5 positions has been reduced and is now a single bond, and a ketone has been substituted at the C11 position. Alfaxalone is also a derivative of allopregnanolone, differing from it only by the addition of the C11 ketone. Other closely related steroids include ganaxolone, hydroxydione, minaxolone, pregnanolone, and renanolone.

== History ==
In 1941, progesterone and 5β-pregnanedione were discovered to have CNS depressant effects in rodents. This began a search to make a synthetic steroid that could be used as an anesthetic. Most of these efforts were aimed at making alfaxalone more water-soluble.

In 1971, a combination of alfaxalone and alfadolone acetate was released as the anesthetics Althesin (for human use) and Saffan (for veterinary use). The two were dissolved in Cremophor EL: a polyoxyelthylated castor oil surfactant.

Althesin was removed from the market in 1984 for causing anaphylaxis; it was later found that this was due to Cremophor EL, which caused the body to release histamine, rather than alfaxolone or alfadolone. Saffan was removed from use for dogs only, but stayed on for other animals, none of which histamine release to the same extent that dogs did. It was still especially valued in cats for its lack of depressant effects on the cardiovascular system, which made it three times less fatal than any other anesthetic on the market at the time. The release of histamine caused most cats (69%) to have edema and hyperemia in their ears and paws; only some also got laryngeal or pulmonary edema.

In 1999, a lyophilized form of alfaxalone was released for cats. The new drug, Alfaxan, used a cyclodextrin as a carrier agent to make alfaxalone more water-soluble rather than Cremophor EL. Alfadolone was not included in the mixture, as its hypnotic effects were quite weak. An aqueous form of Alfaxan was released in Australia in 2000–2001, and Saffan was finally removed from the market in 2002. Alfaxan was released in the UK in 2007, central Europe in 2008, Canada in 2011, and the United States in 2012.

Currently, a human form of alfaxalone is in development under the name "Phaxan": alfaxalone will be dissolved in 7-sulfo-butyl-ether-β-cyclodextrin, which, unlike the cyclodextrin used in Alfaxan, is not toxic to people.

== Society and culture ==
=== Generic names ===
Alfaxalone is the INN, BAN, DCF, and JAN of alfaxolone. Alphaxalone was the former BAN of the drug, but this was eventually changed. Alphaxolone and alfaxolone are additional alternative spellings.

=== Brand names ===
Alfaxalone was marketed in 1971 in combination with alfadolone acetate under the brand name Althesin for human use and Saffan for veterinary use. Althesin was withdrawn from the market in 1984, whereas Saffan remained marketed. A new formulation containing alfaxalone only was introduced for veterinary use in 1999 under the brand name Alfaxan. Following the introduction of Alfaxan, Saffan was gradually discontinued and is now no longer marketed. Another new formulation containing alfaxalone alone is currently under development for use in humans with the tentative brand name Phaxan.

=== Availability ===
Alfaxalone is marketed for veterinary use under the brand name Alfaxan in a number of countries, including Australia, Belgium, Canada, France, Germany, Ireland, Japan, the Netherlands, New Zealand, South Africa, South Korea, Spain, Taiwan, the United Kingdom, and the United States.
