= Steroid hormone receptor =

Group of protein families

Steroid hormone receptors are found in the nucleus, cytosol, and also on the plasma membrane of target cells. They are generally intracellular receptors (typically cytoplasmic or nuclear) and initiate signal transduction for steroid hormones which lead to changes in gene expression over a time period of hours to days. The best studied steroid hormone receptors are members of the nuclear receptor subfamily 3 (NR3) that include receptors for estrogen (group NR3A) and 3-ketosteroids (group NR3C). In addition to nuclear receptors, several G protein-coupled receptors and ion channels act as cell surface receptors for certain steroid hormones.

A steroid hormone receptor is a protein molecule located either within the cell cytoplasm or nucleus that specifically binds to steroid hormones, such as estrogen, progesterone, and testosterone, leading to the activation or suppression of gene expression and subsequent cellular responses. This interaction is crucial for mediating the physiological effects of steroid hormones in various tissues and organs of the body.

== Types ==
Steroid hormone receptors can be categorized into several types based on their specific ligands and functions:

1. Estrogen receptors (ERs): There are two subtypes, estrogen receptor alpha (ERα) and estrogen receptor beta (ERβ), which bind to the hormone estrogen. They regulate gene expression in response to estrogen, playing essential roles in reproductive tissues, bone metabolism, and cardiovascular health.

2. Progesterone receptors (PRs): PRs bind to the hormone progesterone and regulate gene expression in response to its signaling. They are critical for various reproductive processes, including menstruation, pregnancy, and mammary gland development.

3. Androgen receptors (ARs): These receptors bind to androgens such as testosterone and dihydrotestosterone (DHT). They play key roles in the development and function of male reproductive organs, as well as in secondary sexual characteristics and muscle growth.

4. Glucocorticoid receptors (GRs): GRs bind to glucocorticoids like cortisol and regulate gene expression in response to stress and metabolic signals. They are involved in processes such as immune response, metabolism, and stress adaptation.

5. Mineralocorticoid receptors (MRs): MRs primarily bind to mineralocorticoids such as aldosterone and regulate electrolyte balance and blood pressure by controlling ion transport in epithelial cells of the kidney and other tissues.

=== Nuclear receptors ===
Steroid receptors of the nuclear receptor family are all transcription factors. Depending upon the type of receptor, they are either located in the cytosol and move to the cell nucleus upon activation, or remain in the nucleus waiting for the steroid hormone to enter and activate them. This uptake into the nucleus is facilitated by nuclear localization signal found in the hinge region of the receptor. This region of the receptor is covered up by heat shock proteins which bind the receptor until the hormone is present. Upon binding by the hormone the receptor undergoes a conformational change releasing the heat shock proteins, and the receptor together with the bound hormone enter the nucleus to act upon transcription.

- Nuclear receptors
  - Subfamily 3: Estrogen Receptor-like
    - Group A: Estrogen receptor (Sex hormones: Estrogen)
      - 1: Estrogen receptor-α (ERα; NR3A1, ESR1)
      - 2: Estrogen receptor-β (ERβ; NR3A2, ESR2)
    - Group C: 3-Ketosteroid receptors
      - 1: Glucocorticoid receptor (GR; NR3C1) (Cortisol)
      - 2: Mineralocorticoid receptor (MR; NR3C2) (Aldosterone)
      - 3: Progesterone receptor (PR; NR3C3, PGR) (Sex hormones: Progesterone)
      - 4: Androgen receptor (AR; NR3C4, AR) (Sex hormones: Testosterone)

==== Structure ====
Intracellular steroid hormone receptors share a common structure of four units that are functionally homologous, so-called "domains":

1. Variable domain: It begins at the N-terminal and is the most variable domain between the different receptors.
2. DNA binding domain: This centrally located highly conserved DNA binding domain (DBD) consists of two non-repetitive globular motifs where zinc is coordinated with four cysteine and no histidine residues. Their secondary and tertiary structure is distinct from that of classic zinc fingers. This region controls which gene will be activated. On DNA it interacts with the hormone response element (HRE).
3. Hinge region: This area controls the movement of the receptor to the nucleus.
4. Hormone binding domain: The moderately conserved ligand-binding domain (LBD) can include a nuclear localization signal, amino-acid sequences capable of binding chaperones and parts of dimerization interfaces. Such receptors are closely related to chaperones (namely heat shock proteins hsp90 and hsp56), which are required to maintain their inactive (but receptive) cytoplasmic conformation. At the end of this domain is the C-terminal. The terminal connects the molecule to its pair in the homodimer or heterodimer. It may affect the magnitude of the response.

==== Mechanism of action ====
===== Genomic =====
Depending on their mechanism of action and subcellular distribution, nuclear receptors may be classified into at least two classes. Nuclear receptors that bind steroid hormones are all classified as type I receptors. Only type I receptors have a heat shock protein (HSP) associated with the inactive receptor that will be released when the receptor interacts with the ligand. Type I receptors may be found in homodimer or heterodimer forms. Type II nuclear receptors have no HSP, and in contrast to the classical type I receptor are located in the cell nucleus.

Free (that is, unbound) steroids enter the cell cytoplasm and interact with their receptor. In this process heat shock protein is dissociated, and the activated receptor-ligand complex is translocated into the nucleus. It is also related to EAATs.

After binding to the ligand (steroid hormone), steroid receptors often form dimers. In the nucleus, the complex acts as a transcription factor, augmenting or suppressing transcription particular genes by its action on DNA.

Type II receptors are located in the nucleus. Thus, their ligands pass through the cell membrane and cytoplasm and enter the nucleus where they activate the receptor without release of HSP. The activated receptor interacts with the hormone response element and the transcription process is initiated as with type I receptors.

===== Non-genomic =====
The cell membrane aldosterone receptor has shown to increase the activity of the basolateral Na/K ATPase, ENaC sodium channels and ROMK potassium channels of the principal cell in the distal tubule and cortical collecting duct of nephrons (as well as in the large bowel and possibly in sweat glands).

There is some evidence that certain steroid hormone receptors can extend through lipid bilayer membranes at the surface of cells and might be able to interact with hormones that remain outside cells.

Steroid hormone receptors can also function outside the nucleus and couple to cytoplasmic signal transduction proteins such as PI3k and Akt kinase.

=== Other ===
Steroid hormone receptors exert their effects through several mechanisms, including:

1. Gene Regulation: Upon ligand binding, steroid hormone receptors translocate to the nucleus, where they bind to specific DNA sequences called hormone response elements (HREs) within the regulatory regions of target genes. This binding either activates or suppresses gene transcription, leading to changes in mRNA levels and ultimately protein synthesis.

2. Transcriptional Coactivators and Corepressors: Steroid hormone receptors recruit coactivator or corepressor proteins to the gene promoter regions, which modulate the activity of RNA polymerase and other transcriptional machinery, thereby influencing gene expression.

3. Chromatin Remodeling: Steroid hormone receptors can also induce changes in chromatin structure through the recruitment of chromatin remodeling complexes. This allows for accessibility of the transcriptional machinery to specific gene regulatory regions, facilitating or inhibiting gene transcription.

4. Non-Genomic Signaling: In addition to classical genomic actions, steroid hormone receptors can initiate rapid, non-genomic signaling pathways in the cytoplasm or at the cell membrane. These pathways involve activation of various protein kinases and other signaling molecules, leading to rapid cellular responses such as ion fluxes, cytoskeletal rearrangements, and activation of second messenger systems.

5. Cross-Talk with Other Signaling Pathways: Steroid hormone receptors can also interact with and modulate the activity of other signaling pathways, such as growth factor signaling pathways, thereby integrating hormonal and growth factor signals to regulate cellular processes.

A new class of steroid hormone receptors has recently been elucidated and these new receptors are found on the cell membrane. New studies suggest that along with the well documented intracellular receptors that cell membrane receptors are present for several steroid hormones and that their cellular responses are much quicker than the intracellular receptors.

==== G protein-coupled receptors ====
GPCR linked proteins most likely interact with steroid hormones through an amino acid consensus sequence traditionally thought of as a cholesterol recognition and interaction site. About a third of Class A GPCRs contain this sequence. The steroid hormones themselves are different enough from one another that they do not all affect all of the GPCR linked proteins; however, the similarities between the steroid hormones and between the receptors make plausible the argument that each receptor may respond to multiple steroid hormones or that each hormone could affect multiple receptors. This is contrary to the traditional model of having a unique receptor for each unique ligand.

At least four different GPCR-linked proteins are known to respond to steroid hormones. GPR30 binds estrogen, membrane progestin receptor (mPR) binds progesterone, and GPRC6A binds androgens. As an example of the effects of these GPCR-linked proteins consider GPR30. GPR30 binds estrogen, and upon binding estrogen this pathway activates adenylyl cyclase and epidermal growth factor receptor. It results in vasodilation, renoprotection, mammary gland development, etc.

Sulfated steroids and bile acids are also detected by vomeronasal receptors, specifically the V1 family.

==== Ion channels ====
Neuroactive steroids bind to and modulate the activity of several ion channels including the GABA_{A}, NMDA, and sigma receptors.

The first demonstration that endogenous steroid metabolites can rapidly modulate ion channel activity was published in Science in 1986 by the NIMH group of Majewska et al. This work showed that certain pregnane steroids directly alter GABAA receptor function within seconds, indicating a fast, non-genomic mechanism of steroid action distinct from classical nuclear receptor signaling. These findings provided the earliest evidence that steroid hormones can act through membrane-associated receptors or ion channels, anticipating later descriptions of rapid steroid signaling pathways.

The steroid progesterone has been found to modulate the activity of CatSper (cation channels of sperm) voltage-gated Ca^{2+} channels. Since eggs release progesterone, sperm may use progesterone as a homing signal to swim toward eggs (chemotaxis).

==== SHBG/SHBG-R complex ====
Sex hormone-binding globulin (SHBG) is thought to mainly function as a transporter and reservoir for the estradiol and testosterone sex hormones. However it has also been demonstrated that SHBG can bind to a cell surface receptor (SHBG-R). The SHBG-R has not been completely characterized. A subset of steroids are able to bind to the SHBG/SHBG-R complex resulting in an activation of adenylyl cyclase and synthesis of the cAMP second messenger. Hence the SHBG/SHBG-R complex appears to act as a transmembrane steroid receptor that is capable of transmitting signals to the interior of cells.

== See also ==
- Membrane steroid receptor
- Nuclear receptor
