= Hydroxydione =

Chemical compound

- Hydroxydione

- Hydroxydione sodium succinate

Clinical data
- Trade names: Viadril, Predion, Presuren
- Other names: 21-Hydroxy-5β-pregnane-3,20-dione
- ATC code: None

Legal status
- Legal status: BR: Class C1 (Other controlled substances)

Identifiers
- IUPAC name: (5R,8R,9S,10S,13S,14S,17S)-17-(2-hydroxyacetyl)-10,13-dimethyl-1,2,4,5,6,7,8,9,11,12,14,15,16,17-tetradecahydrocyclopenta[a]phenanthren-3-one
- CAS Number: 303-01-5
- PubChem CID: 257630
- DrugBank: DB08956
- ChemSpider: 226020
- UNII: B7VFN88375
- CompTox Dashboard (EPA): DTXSID401027269

Chemical and physical data
- Formula: C_{21}H_{32}O_{3}
- Molar mass: 332.484 g·mol^{−1}
- 3D model (JSmol): Interactive image
- SMILES: C[C@]12CCC(=O)C[C@H]1CC[C@@H]3[C@@H]2CC[C@]4([C@H]3CC[C@@H]4C(=O)CO)C
- InChI: InChI=1S/C21H32O3/c1-20-9-7-14(23)11-13(20)3-4-15-16-5-6-18(19(24)12-22)21(16,2)10-8-17(15)20/h13,15-18,22H,3-12H2,1-2H3/t13-,15+,16+,17+,18-,20+,21+/m1/s1; Key:USPYDUPOCUYHQL-VEVMSBRDSA-N

Hydroxydione, also known as 21-hydroxy-5β-pregnane-3,20-dione, is a neuroactive steroid which was formerly used as a general anesthetic, but was discontinued due to incidence of thrombophlebitis in patients. It was formulated as the sodium salt of the hemisuccinate ester prodrug hydroxydione sodium succinate (INN, USAN, BAN) and sold under the brand names Viadril, Predion, and Presuren.

Hydroxydione was introduced in 1957, and was the first neuroactive steroid general anesthetic to be introduced for clinical use, an event which was shortly preceded by the observation in 1954 of the sedative properties of progesterone in mice.

== Chemistry ==
Related compounds include alfadolone, alfaxolone, dihydrodeoxycorticosterone, ganaxolone, minaxolone, pregnanolone, and renanolone.
