= Thiobutabarbital =

Chemical compound

Clinical data
- Other names: Thiobutabarbital, Inactin, Brevinarcon, 5-sec-Butyl-5-ethyl-2-thiobarbituric acid
- ATC code: none

Identifiers
- IUPAC name: 5-sec-butyl-5-ethyl-2-thioxodihydropyrimidine-4,6(1H,5H)-dione
- CAS Number: 2095-57-0
- PubChem CID: 3032373
- ChemSpider: 2297366
- UNII: 2N0251U7JH
- CompTox Dashboard (EPA): DTXSID90871862
- ECHA InfoCard: 100.016.600

Chemical and physical data
- Formula: C_{10}H_{16}N_{2}O_{2}S
- Molar mass: 228.31 g·mol^{−1}
- 3D model (JSmol): Interactive image
- SMILES: O=C1NC(=S)NC(=O)C1(C(C)CC)CC
- InChI: InChI=1S/C10H16N2O2S/c1-4-6(3)10(5-2)7(13)11-9(15)12-8(10)14/h6H,4-5H2,1-3H3,(H2,11,12,13,14,15); Key:IDELNEDBPWKHGK-UHFFFAOYSA-N

Thiobutabarbital (Inactin, Brevinarcon) is a short-acting barbiturate derivative invented in the 1950s. It has sedative, anticonvulsant and hypnotic effects, and is still used in veterinary medicine for induction in surgical anaesthesia.

== Stereochemistry ==
Thiobutabarbital contains a stereocenter and consists of two enantiomers. This is a racemate, i.e. a 1:1 mixture of (R)- and the (S)-form:

Enantiomers of Thiobutabarbital
(R)-Form	(S)-Form
