= Ardeparin =

Pharmaceutical drug

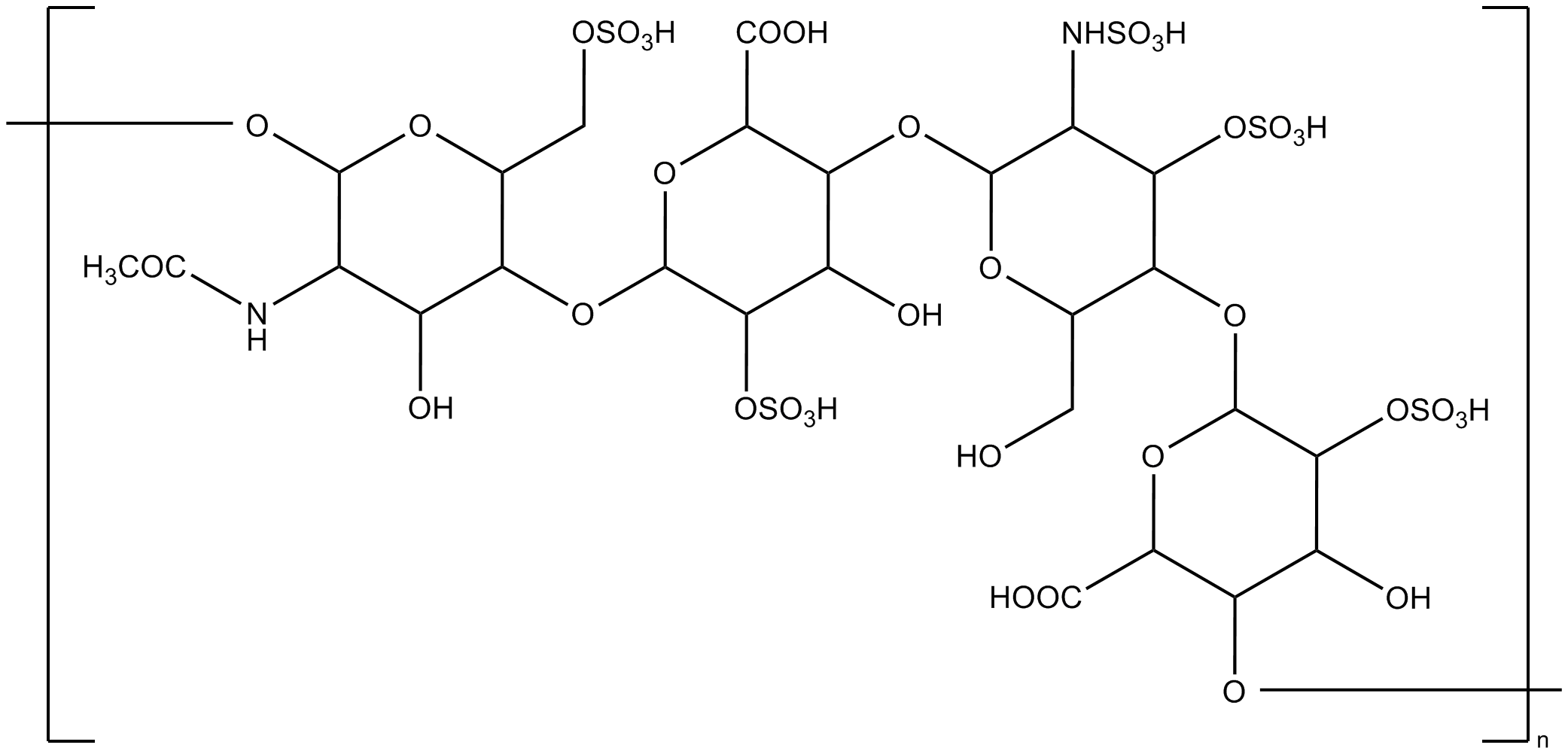

Clinical data
- AHFS/Drugs.com: Multum Consumer Information
- Routes of administration: Injection
- ATC code: None

Legal status
- Legal status: US: ℞-only

Pharmacokinetic data
- Bioavailability: 92%

Identifiers
- IUPAC name: 6-[5-acetylamino-4,6-dihydroxy-2-(sulfooxymethyl)tetrahydropyran-3-yl]oxy-3-[5-(6-
- CAS Number: 9041-08-1
- DrugBank: DB00407
- ChemSpider: none
- UNII: N3927D01PB
- ChEMBL: ChEMBL1201448
- CompTox Dashboard (EPA): DTXSID301010914
- ECHA InfoCard: 100.110.590

Chemical and physical data
- Formula: (C_{26}H_{40}N_{2}O_{36}S_{5})_{n}
- Molar mass: 5500–6500 g/mol (average)

Ardeparin (brand name Normiflo) is an anticoagulant. It was used for the prevention of deep vein thrombosis, but was withdrawn from the US market in 2000 for reasons unrelated to safety or efficacy.
