= Alatrofloxacin =

Chemical compound

Clinical data
- AHFS/Drugs.com: Micromedex Detailed Consumer Information
- MedlinePlus: a605016
- Routes of administration: Intravenous
- ATC code: none

Legal status
- Legal status: Withdrawn

Pharmacokinetic data
- Bioavailability: N/A
- Protein binding: 76% (trovafloxacin)
- Metabolism: Quickly hydrolyzed to trovafloxacin
- Elimination half-life: 9 to 12 hours (trovafloxacin)
- Excretion: Fecal and renal (trovafloxacin)

Identifiers
- IUPAC name: 7-[(1R,5S)-6-{[(2S)-1-{[(2S)-2-Aminopropanoyl]amino}-1-oxopropan-2-yl]amino}-3-azabicyclo[3.1.0]hexan-3-yl]-1-(2,4-difluorophenyl)-6-fluoro-4-oxo-1,8-naphthyridine-3-carboxylic acid
- CAS Number: 146961-76-4
- ChemSpider: 21243647
- UNII: 7QVV6I50DT
- ChEMBL: ChEMBL1201197

Chemical and physical data
- Formula: C_{26}H_{25}F_{3}N_{6}O_{5}
- Molar mass: 558.518 g·mol^{−1}
- 3D model (JSmol): Interactive image
- SMILES: C[C@@H](C(=O)N[C@@H](C)C(=O)N[C@H]1[C@H]2[C@@H]1CN(C2)C3=C(C=C4C(=O)C(=CN(C4=N3)C5=C(C=C(C=C5)F)F)C(=O)O)F)N
- InChI: InChI=1S/C26H25F3N6O5/c1-10(30)24(37)31-11(2)25(38)32-20-14-7-34(8-15(14)20)23-18(29)6-13-21(36)16(26(39)40)9-35(22(13)33-23)19-4-3-12(27)5-17(19)28/h3-6,9-11,14-15,20H,7-8,30H2,1-2H3,(H,31,37)(H,32,38)(H,39,40)/t10-,11-,14-,15+,20+/m0/s1; Key:UUZPPAMZDFLUHD-VUJLHGSVSA-N

Alatrofloxacin (Trovan IV) is a fluoroquinolone antibiotic developed by Pfizer, delivered as a mesylate salt. It is a prodrug of Trovafloxacin.

Trovafloxacin and alatrofloxacin were both withdrawn from the U.S. market in June 2006 due to hepatotoxicity leading to liver transplant or death.

== See also ==
- Fluoroquinolones
