= Neurosteroid =

Compounds that alter neuronal activity

Zuranolone, an example of a neurosteroid, used for the treatment of postpartum depression

Neurosteroids, also known as neuroactive steroids, are endogenous or exogenous steroids that rapidly alter neuronal excitability through interaction with ligand-gated ion channels and other cell surface receptors. The term neurosteroid was coined by the French physiologist Étienne-Émile Baulieu and refers to steroids synthesized in the brain. The term, neuroactive steroid refers to steroids that can be synthesized in the brain, or are synthesized by an endocrine gland, that then reach the brain through the bloodstream and have effects on brain function. The term neuroactive steroids was first coined in 1992 by Steven Paul and Robert Purdy. In addition to their actions on neuronal membrane receptors, some of these steroids may also exert effects on gene expression via nuclear steroid hormone receptors. Neurosteroids have a wide range of potential clinical applications from sedation to treatment of epilepsy and traumatic brain injury. Ganaxolone, a synthetic analog of the endogenous neurosteroid allopregnanolone, is under investigation for the treatment of epilepsy.

== Classification ==
Based on differences in activity and structure, neurosteroids can be broadly categorized into several different major groupings.

=== Inhibitory neurosteroids ===
These neurosteroids exert inhibitory actions on neurotransmission. They act as positive allosteric modulators of the GABA_{A} receptor (especially δ subunit-containing isoforms), and possess, in no particular order, antidepressant, anxiolytic, stress-reducing, rewarding, prosocial, antiaggressive, prosexual, sedative, pro-sleep, cognitive and memory-impairing, analgesic, anesthetic, anticonvulsant, neuroprotective, and neurogenic effects.

Major examples include tetrahydrodeoxycorticosterone (THDOC), the androstane 3α-androstanediol, the cholestane cholesterol and the pregnanes pregnanolone (eltanolone), allopregnanolone (3α,5α-THP).

=== Excitatory neurosteroids ===
These neurosteroids have excitatory effects on neurotransmission. They act as potent negative allosteric modulators of the GABA_{A} receptor, weak positive allosteric modulators of the NMDA receptor, and/or agonists of the σ_{1} receptor, and mostly have antidepressant, anxiogenic, cognitive and memory-enhancing, convulsant, neuroprotective, and neurogenic effects.

Major examples include the pregnanes pregnenolone sulfate (PS), epipregnanolone, and isopregnanolone (sepranolone), the androstanes dehydroepiandrosterone (DHEA; prasterone), and dehydroepiandrosterone sulfate (DHEA-S; prasterone sulfate), and the cholestane 24(S)-hydroxycholesterol (NMDA receptor-selective; very potent).

=== Pheromones ===
Pheromones are neurosteroids that influence brain activity, notably hypothalamic function, via activation of vomeronasal receptor cells.

Possible human pheromones include the androstanes androstadienol, androstadienone, androstenol, and androstenone and the estrane estratetraenol.

=== Other neurosteroids ===
Certain other endogenous steroids, such as pregnenolone, progesterone, estradiol, and corticosterone are also neurosteroids. However, unlike those listed above, these neurosteroids do not modulate the GABA_{A} or NMDA receptors, and instead affect various other cell surface receptors and non-genomic targets. Also, many endogenous steroids, including pregnenolone, progesterone, corticosterone, deoxycorticosterone, DHEA, and testosterone, are metabolized into (other) neurosteroids, effectively functioning as so-called proneurosteroids.

== Biosynthesis ==
Neurosteroids are synthesized from cholesterol, which is converted into pregnenolone and then into all other endogenous steroids. Neurosteroids are produced in the brain after local synthesis or by conversion of peripherally-derived adrenal steroids or gonadal steroids. They accumulate especially in myelinating glial cells, from cholesterol or steroidal precursors imported from peripheral sources. 5α-reductase type I and 3α-hydroxysteroid dehydrogenase are involved in the biosynthesis of inhibitory neurosteroids, while 3β-hydroxysteroid dehydrogenase and hydroxysteroid sulfotransferases are involved in excitatory neurosteroid production.

== Biological Function ==
Some major known biological functions of neurosteroids include modulation of neural plasticity, learning and memory processes, behavior, and seizure susceptibility, as well as responses to stress, anxiety, and depression. Neurosteroids also appear to play an important role in various sexually-dimorphic behaviors and emotional responses.

Acute stress elevates the levels of inhibitory neurosteroids like allopregnanolone, and these neurosteroids are known to counteract many of the effects of stress. This is similar to the case of endorphins, which are released in response to stress and physical pain and counteract the negative subjective effects of such states. As such, it has been suggested that one of the biological functions of these neuromodulators may be to help maintain emotional homeostasis. Chronic stress has been associated with diminished levels of allopregnanolone and altered allopregnanolone stress responsivity, psychiatric disorders, and hypothalamic-pituitary-adrenal axis dysregulation.

It is thought that fluctuations in the levels of inhibitory neurosteroids during the menstrual cycle and pregnancy play an important role in a variety of women's conditions, including premenstrual syndrome (PMS), premenstrual dysphoric disorder (PMDD), postpartum depression (PPD), postpartum psychosis, and catamenial epilepsy. In addition, it is thought that changes in neurosteroid levels may be involved in the changes in mood, anxiety, and sexual desire that occur during puberty in both sexes and during menopause in women.

Elevated levels of inhibitory neurosteroids, namely allopregnanolone, can produce paradoxical effects, such as negative mood, anxiety, irritability, and aggression. This appears to be because these neurosteroids, like other positive allosteric modulators of the GABA_{A} receptor such as the benzodiazepines, barbiturates, and ethanol, possess biphasic, U-shaped actions – moderate levels (in the range of 1.5–2 nM/L total alloprogesterone, which are approximately equivalent to luteal phase levels) inhibit the activity of the GABA_{A} receptor, while lower and higher concentrations facilitate the activity of the receptor.

== Molecular mechanism and translational developments ==
=== Biological importance and functions in maintaining homeostasis ===
Neurosteroids are important endogenous regulators of brain function. Through interactions with neuronal receptors and neurotransmitter systems, they affect nerve cell excitability, synaptic transmission, and the integration of neural networks. Neurosteroids are now recognized as the main modulators of brain physiology and pathology. Of particular importance is their modulating effect on the balance between inhibitory and excitatory neurotransmission, in which γ-aminobutyric acid (GABA), glutamate and other neurotransmitter systems are particularly involved. Neurosteroids also contribute to the regulation of stress responses, activity of the hypothalamic-pituitary-adrenocortical (HPA) axis, emotional behavior and cognitive processes. Their effects are not limited to neurotransmission, but also include the regulation of neuroinflammatory processes, nerve cell survival, neurogenesis and myelination. Thanks to their dynamic adaptation to physiological conditions and environmental stimuli, these substances contribute to the maintenance of neuronal homeostasis and adaptation of the central nervous system. Changes in their synthesis, metabolism or receptor-mediated signaling are associated with disorders of these regulatory processes and increased susceptibility to various psychiatric and neurological disorders.

=== Historical milestones in neurosteroid research ===
The history of neurosteroid research can be traced through several major discoveries. In 1938, Beall and Reichstein isolated 3α-hydroxy-5α-pregnan-20-one (allopregnanolone) from adrenal tissue during investigations of peripheral steroid metabolism, without knowledge of its neurological activity. In 1941, Hans Selye demonstrated that steroid hormones could produce rapid anesthetic effects in experimental animals, providing early evidence of their neuroactive properties. A further breakthrough came in 1981, when Corpéchot et al. identified steroid compounds in the brain at concentrations suggesting local synthesis independent of peripheral endocrine glands, helping establish the concept of neurosteroids.

Between 1984 and 1986, electrophysiological and biochemical studies connected steroid action to the GABAA receptor system. Harrison and Simmonds (1984) demonstrated positive modulation of GABA receptor function by the steroid anesthetic alphaxalone, while Majewska et al. (1985, 1986) investigated glucocorticoid modulation and demonstrated the potent effects of endogenous steroid metabolites, including allopregnanolone, on the GABA receptor–chloride channel complex. These discoveries established the foundations for subsequent research into neurosteroid biosynthesis, receptor-binding sites, physiological functions and therapeutic applications. In later publications, Majewska and Schwartz emphasized that the discovery of steroid modulation of GABAergic neurotransmission opened new directions for research into the neurobiological basis of numerous psychophysiological phenomena. They suggested (1987) that this mechanism of steroid neuroactivity might be relevant to stress, depression, anxiety, aggression and memory, as well as to conditions such as postpartum depression and premenstrual tension. These suggestions helped establish a broader research agenda extending from molecular neurochemistry to behavioral and psychiatric processes.

=== Molecular Brain function of neurosteroids ===
Beginning in the late 1970s, Baulieu with collaborators at INSERM investigated the presence and metabolism of steroid hormones in the central nervous system. In a series of studies published between 1978 and 1981, they demonstrated that pregnenolone, dehydroepiandrosterone (DHEA), and related steroids are synthesized de novo in the brain, independently of peripheral endocrine glands. In 1981 Baulieu introduced the term “neurosteroids” to describe these endogenously produced steroids with potential neuromodulatory actions. During the early 1980s Baulieu’s group catalogued the distribution of neurosteroids in different brain regions and documented their variation across age, stress, and physiological states. At that time Baulieu believed that, although neurosteroids were clearly present in the central nervous system, their mechanism of action in neuroactivity and physiological function remained unknown.

Mechanistic Fundamentals A further advance occurred in 1986, when Majewska, Harrison et al. at NIMH reported that allopregnanolone and related neurosteroids are potent positive modulators of the GABAA receptor. This work provided the first molecular mechanism for neurosteroid action and established a direct link between Baulieu’s discovery of brain-derived steroids and inhibitory neurotransmission. This was followed by the groups' research throughout the late 1980s and 1990s, that expanded the concept of neurosteroid modulation of GABAergic signaling and its relevance to stress, anxiety, seizure susceptibility, and mood regulation. NIMH acknowledged the importance of this basic research for the first therapeutics 40 years later:

Taking allopregnanolone from bench to bedside: Brexanolone, first-ever drug specifically designed for postpartum depression, later discontinued, was created as a development of a series of basic and translational neuroscience studies, that began in the NIMH Intramural Research Program (IRP). From neurobiology through translational science and into biomarker-guided mechanistic clinical trials – this was NIMH’s drug development approach, with the discovery of the allopregnanolone brain function as an exemplary case.

=== Neurosteroid binding sites on GABAA receptors ===
Neurosteroids work through two main pathways:

1. Rapid, non-genomic effects: positive modulation of GABAA receptors, i.e. anxiolytic, anticonvulsant, and sedative modulation of NMDA receptors. Stimulant effect on signaling pathways. Examples of such neurosteroids: allopregnanolone (3α,5α THP) THDOC (3α,5α THDOC), pregnenolone (3α,5β THP). Antagonistic neurosteroids: pregnanolone sulfate, DHEAS.

2. Slow, genomic effects affect gene expression via classical steroid receptors.

Neurosteroids modulate GABAA receptors by binding to multiple sites within their transmembrane domains. A major advance was the identification of a canonical intersubunit binding site at the interface between α and β subunits, where positive allosteric modulators such as allopregnanolone and tetrahydrodeoxycorticosterone (THDOC) enhance GABA-induced chloride currents.

At higher concentrations, some neurosteroids can also directly activate the receptor in the absence of GABA. Subsequent studies using photoaffinity labeling, mutagenesis and structural methods, including cryogenic electron microscopy (cryo-EM), identified additional intrasubunit binding sites and revealed that different sites can produce distinct effects on receptor function, including potentiation, direct activation and desensitization. These sites are highly conserved throughout the GABAA receptor family, and their identification provides a unique opportunity for the development of new therapeutic, neurosteroid-based ligands and transgenic disease models of neurosteroid dysfunction. Sulfated neurosteroids, such as pregnenolone sulfate, can inhibit GABA receptor activity through mechanisms distinct from those of positive modulators. Recent structural and direct-binding studies have further characterized these interactions and their allosteric relationships. Although the precise contributions of individual binding sites in different native receptor subtypes remain under investigation, their identification has provided an important molecular foundation for understanding neurosteroid action and developing neuroactive steroid therapeutics.

=== Development of neurosteroid-based therapeutics ===
The discovery of neurosteroid modulation of GABAA receptors stimulated research into their potential therapeutic applications in neurological and psychiatric disorders. In the early 21st century, the neurosteroid field developed into a translational research area in neuropsychopharmacology. Later it was demonstrated that brain allopregnanolone levels are regulated by stress and can be altered independently of peripheral steroid production, providing a clinical rationale for investigating neurosteroid-based treatments. Preclinical studies also demonstrated anxiolytic and antidepressant-like effects of allopregnanolone, while research into the hormonal changes accompanying pregnancy and childbirth suggested a possible role for postpartum neurosteroid withdrawal in postpartum depression.

These results led to the development of Brexanolone, an intravenous formulation of allopregnanolone, which showed rapid antidepressant effects in phase II and III clinical trials and was approved by the US Food and Drug Administration (FDA) in 2019 for postpartum depression. A further development was Zuranolone, an orally active synthetic neuroactive steroid and positive allosteric modulator of GABAA receptors, approved by the FDA in 2023 for postpartum depression. In 2025 Zuranolone was approved in Japan for major depressive disorder and depressive states, following a Japanese phase III clinical trial. These developments represent a transition from basic research on endogenous neurosteroids to clinically established neuroactive steroid therapeutics.

==== Postpartum depression ====
After discontinuation of Brexanolone, an intravenous formula of allopregnanolone, Zuranolone, an oral synthetic analogue, received FDA approval in 2023 as the first oral therapy for PPD. In the US and Europe, Zuranolone is approved for the treatment of PPD in adult women; in Canada, it is approved for the treatment of moderate to severe PPD. Clinical studies show that Zuranolone can cause a significant reduction in symptoms of depression within 15 days, which lasts up to 45 days after treatment ends. A recent meta-analysis of seven randomized controlled trials concludes that Zuranolone is a fast-acting and well-tolerated treatment for PPD and major depressive disorder. As for the indication for MDD, the FDA's final decision is still pending.

Brexanolone and Zuranolone are recognized as examples of successful development "from laboratory workbench to the patient's bedside", in which clinical observations of hormonal mood swings have been combined with mechanistic results of neurosteroid research. These developments show how advances in central nervous system therapy are based on many years of basic research in receptor biology, neurochemistry, and disease mechanisms.

==== Neurosteroids in Major Depression ====
Zuranolone was approved by the FDA in the United States in 2023 for the treatment of postpartum depression only. The agency rejected approval for Major Depression Disorder (MDD) (Complete Response Letter). Common side effects include drowsiness, dizziness, sedation, headache, and nausea. In Japan, zuranolone (brand name ZURZUVAE) received approval for depression and depressive states (including MDD) in December 2025. The basis was a positive phase III trial in Japan that took 30 mg once daily for 14 days, which showed significant and early improvement in symptoms and the possibility of re-treatment after a break of at least six weeks.

=== Therapeutic significance of neurosteroids and future prospects ===
Awareness that neurosteroids are involved in the regulation of neuronal and neuroimmune homeostasis has spurred the development of therapeutics targeting these pathways. These advances represent important milestones in translating years of research on endogenous neurosteroid signaling into clinical applications. In addition, preclinical and clinical studies are investigating the therapeutic potential of neurosteroid-based therapies in a wider range of psychiatric and neurological disorders, including major depression, bipolar disorder, anxiety disorders, post-traumatic stress disorder, epilepsy, and neurodegenerative diseases.

Future research will focus on identifying biomarkers of neurosteroid dysregulation, developing more selective drugs, optimizing their pharmacological properties, and identifying patient populations most likely to benefit from such treatments. A better understanding of the interactions between neurosteroid signaling pathways, neuronal excitability, stress regulation, and neuroinflammation may open up further therapeutic opportunities, especially therapeutic approaches to restore impaired neuronal homeostasis. Although many of these applications are still being studied, neurosteroid-based neurosteroid pharmacology has emerged as a promising area of translational neurobiology whose therapeutic relevance may extend far beyond diseases for which drugs have already been developed.

== Biological activity ==
=== Sigma-1 receptor ===
Neurosteroids at the σ_{1} receptor
Compound	K_{i} (nM)	Action	Species	Ref
Progesterone	268	Antagonist	Guinea pig	
Deoxycorticosterone	938	Unknown	Guinea pig	
Testosterone	1,014	Unknown	Guinea pig	
Pregnenolone	ND	Agonist	ND	ND
Pregnenolone sulfate	3,198	Agonist	Guinea pig	
DHEA	3,700	Agonist	?	
DHEA-S	ND	Agonist	ND	ND
Corticosterone	4,074	Unknown	Guinea pig	

== Therapeutic applications ==
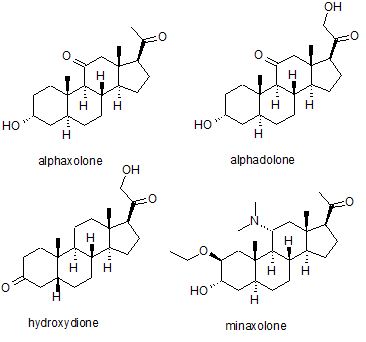
Older clinically used synthetic neuroactive steroids.

=== Anesthesia ===
Several synthetic neurosteroids have been used as sedatives for the purpose of general anaesthesia for carrying out surgical procedures. The best known of these are alphaxolone, alphadolone, hydroxydione, and minaxolone. The first of these to be introduced was hydroxydione, which is the esterified 21-hydroxy derivative of 5β-pregnanedione. Hydroxydione proved to be a useful anaesthetic drug with a good safety profile, but was painful and irritating when injected probably due to poor water solubility. This led to the development of newer neuroactive steroids. The next drug from this family to be marketed was a mixture of alphaxolone and alphadolone, known as Althesin. This was withdrawn from human use due to rare but serious toxic reactions, but is still used in veterinary medicine. The next neurosteroid anaesthetic introduced into human medicine was the newer drug minaxolone, which is around three times more potent than althesin and retains the favourable safety profile, without the toxicity problems seen with althesin. However this drug was also ultimately withdrawn, not because of problems in clinical use, but because animal studies suggested potential carcinogenicity and since alternative agents were available it was felt that the possible risk outweighed the benefit of keeping the drug on the market.

=== Ganaxolone ===
Ganaxolone, a neuroactive steroid currently in clinical development.

The neurosteroid ganaxolone, an analog of the progesterone metabolite allopregnanolone, has been extensively investigated in animal models and is currently in clinical trials for the treatment of epilepsy. Neurosteroids, including ganaxolone have a broad spectrum of activity in animal models. They may have advantages over other GABA_{A} receptor modulators, notably benzodiazepines, in that tolerance does not appear to occur with extended use.

A randomized, placebo controlled, 10-week phase 2 clinical trial of orally administered ganaxolone in adults with partial onset seizure demonstrated that the treatment is safe, well tolerated and efficacious. The drug continued to demonstrate efficacy in a 104-week open label extension. Data from non-clinical studies suggest that ganaxolone may have low risk for use in pregnancy. In addition to use in the treatment of epilepsy, the drug has potential in the treatment of a broad range of neurological and psychiatric conditions. Proof-of-concept studies are currently underway in posttraumatic stress disorder and fragile X syndrome. Ganaxolone was approved for medical use in the United States in March 2022.

=== Catamenial epilepsy ===
Researchers have suggested the use of so-called "neurosteroid replacement therapy" as a way of treating catamenial epilepsy with neuroactive steroids such as ganaxolone during the period of the menstrual cycle when seizure frequency increases. Micronized progesterone, which behaves reliably as a prodrug to allopregnanolone, has been suggested as a treatment for catamenial epilepsy in the same manner.

=== Allopregnanolone ===
Allopregnanolone (SAGE-547) is under development as an intravenous therapy for the treatment of super-refractory status epilepticus, postpartum depression, and essential tremor.

=== Other applications ===
4,16-Androstadien-3β-ol (PH94B, Aloradine) is a synthetic pheromone, or pherine, neurosteroid which is under investigation for the treatment of anxiety disorders in women.

3β-Methoxypregnenolone (MAP-4343), or pregnenolone 3β-methyl ether, is a synthetic neuroactive steroid and pregnenolone derivative that interacts with microtubule-associated protein 2 (MAP2) in a similar manner to pregnenolone and is under development for potential clinical use for indications such as the treatment of brain and spinal cord injury and depressive disorders.

== Role in antidepressant action ==
Certain antidepressant drugs such as fluoxetine and fluvoxamine, which are generally thought to affect depression by acting as selective serotonin reuptake inhibitors (SSRIs), have also been found to increase the levels of certain neurosteroids at concentrations that are inactive in affecting the reuptake of serotonin in animal models. The potential contribution of this steroidogenic action to their therapeutic effects is of considerable interest, particularly in light of evidence that neurosteroid levels are normalized in patients with depression following treatment.

The 3α-hydroxysteroid dehydrogenase (3α-HSD) enzyme is induced by certain (SSRIs), including fluoxetine, fluvoxamine, sertraline, and paroxetine, as well as by certain other antidepressants like venlafaxine and mirtazapine, coinciding with their steroidogenic actions. Enhancement of biosynthesis of inhibitory neurosteroids has been implicated in the antidepressant and anxiolytic effects of some of the SSRIs.

== Benzodiazepine effects on neurosteroids ==
Benzodiazepines may influence neurosteroid metabolism by virtue of their actions on translocator protein (TSPO; "peripheral benzodiazepine receptor"). The pharmacological actions of benzodiazepines at the GABA_{A} receptor are similar to those of neurosteroids, although the localization of benzodiazepine and neurosteroid-sensitive GABA_{A} receptor subtypes vary. Factors which affect the ability of individual benzodiazepines to alter neurosteroid levels may depend upon whether the individual benzodiazepine drug interacts with TSPO. Some benzodiazepines may also inhibit neurosteroidogenic enzymes reducing neurosteroid synthesis.

== See also ==
- List of neurosteroids
- Neurosteroidogenesis inhibitor
- Membrane steroid receptor
