= Zuranolone =

Medication used for postpartum depression

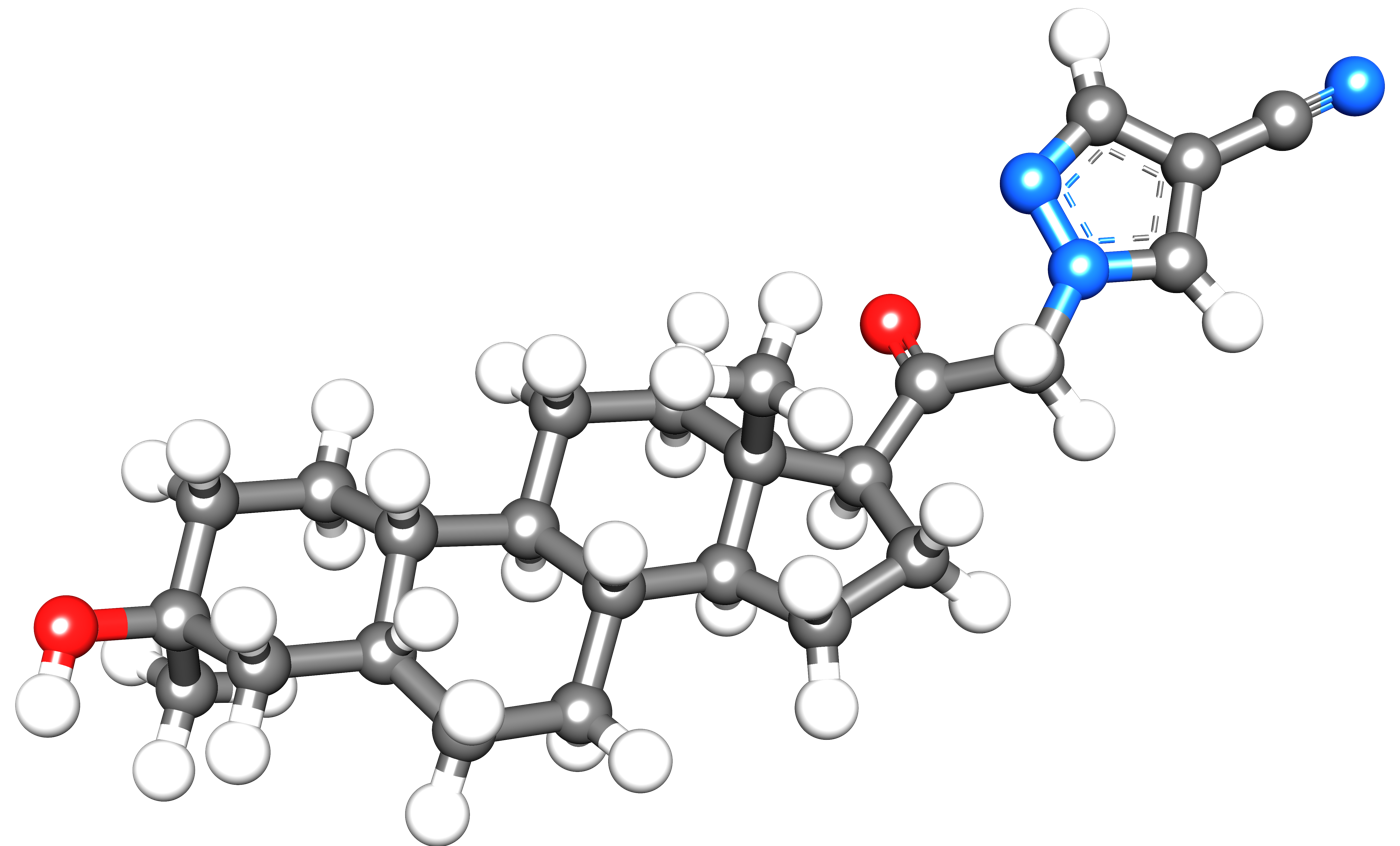

Clinical data
- Pronunciation: /zʊˈrænəloʊn/ zuu-RAN-ə-lohn
- Trade names: Zurzuvae
- Other names: SAGE-217; SAGE217; S-812217; S812217; SGE-797; SGE797; BIIB-125; BIIB125
- AHFS/Drugs.com: Monograph
- MedlinePlus: a623048
- License data: US DailyMed: Zuranolone
- Pregnancy category: Contraindicated
- Routes of administration: Oral
- Drug class: Neurosteroid; GABA_{A} receptor positive allosteric modulator
- ATC code: N06AX31 (WHO)

Legal status
- Legal status: CA: ℞-only; US: Schedule IV; EU: Rx-only

Pharmacokinetic data
- Protein binding: 99.5%
- Metabolism: CYP3A4
- Elimination half-life: 16–23 hours

Identifiers
- IUPAC name: 1-(2-((3R,5R,8R,9R,10S,13S,14S,17S)-3-Hydroxy-3,13-dimethylhexadecahydro-1H-cyclopenta[a]phenanthren-17-yl)-2-oxoethyl)-1H-pyrazole-4-carbonitrile
- CAS Number: 1632051-40-1
- PubChem CID: 86294073
- DrugBank: DB15490
- ChemSpider: 71117610
- UNII: 7ZW49N180B
- KEGG: D11793
- ChEBI: CHEBI:228302
- ChEMBL: ChEMBL4105630
- CompTox Dashboard (EPA): DTXSID601128500
- ECHA InfoCard: 100.271.331

Chemical and physical data
- Formula: C_{25}H_{35}N_{3}O_{2}
- Molar mass: 409.574 g·mol^{−1}
- 3D model (JSmol): Interactive image
- SMILES: O=C(CN1N=CC(C#N)=C1)[C@H]2CC[C@@]3([H])[C@]4([H])CC[C@]5([H])C[C@](C)(O)CC[C@]5([H])[C@@]4([H])CC[C@@]32C
- InChI: InChI=1S/C25H35N3O2/c1-24(30)9-7-18-17(11-24)3-4-20-19(18)8-10-25(2)21(20)5-6-22(25)23(29)15-28-14-16(12-26)13-27-28/h13-14,17-22,30H,3-11,15H2,1-2H3/t17-,18+,19-,20-,21+,22-,24-,25+/m1/s1; Key:HARRKNSQXBRBGZ-GVKWWOCJSA-N

Zuranolone, sold under the brand name Zurzuvae, is a medication used for the treatment of postpartum depression and major depressive disorder. It is taken orally. Zuranolone is a neuroactive steroid which enhances the activity of the neurotransmitter γ-aminobutyric acid (GABA) and is thought to exert antidepressant effects by enhancing GABAergic inhibition.

The most common side effects include drowsiness, dizziness, diarrhea, fatigue, nasopharyngitis, and urinary tract infection.

Zuranolone was approved for medical use in the United States for the treatment of postpartum depression in August 2023. It was developed by Sage Therapeutics and Biogen.

== Medical uses ==
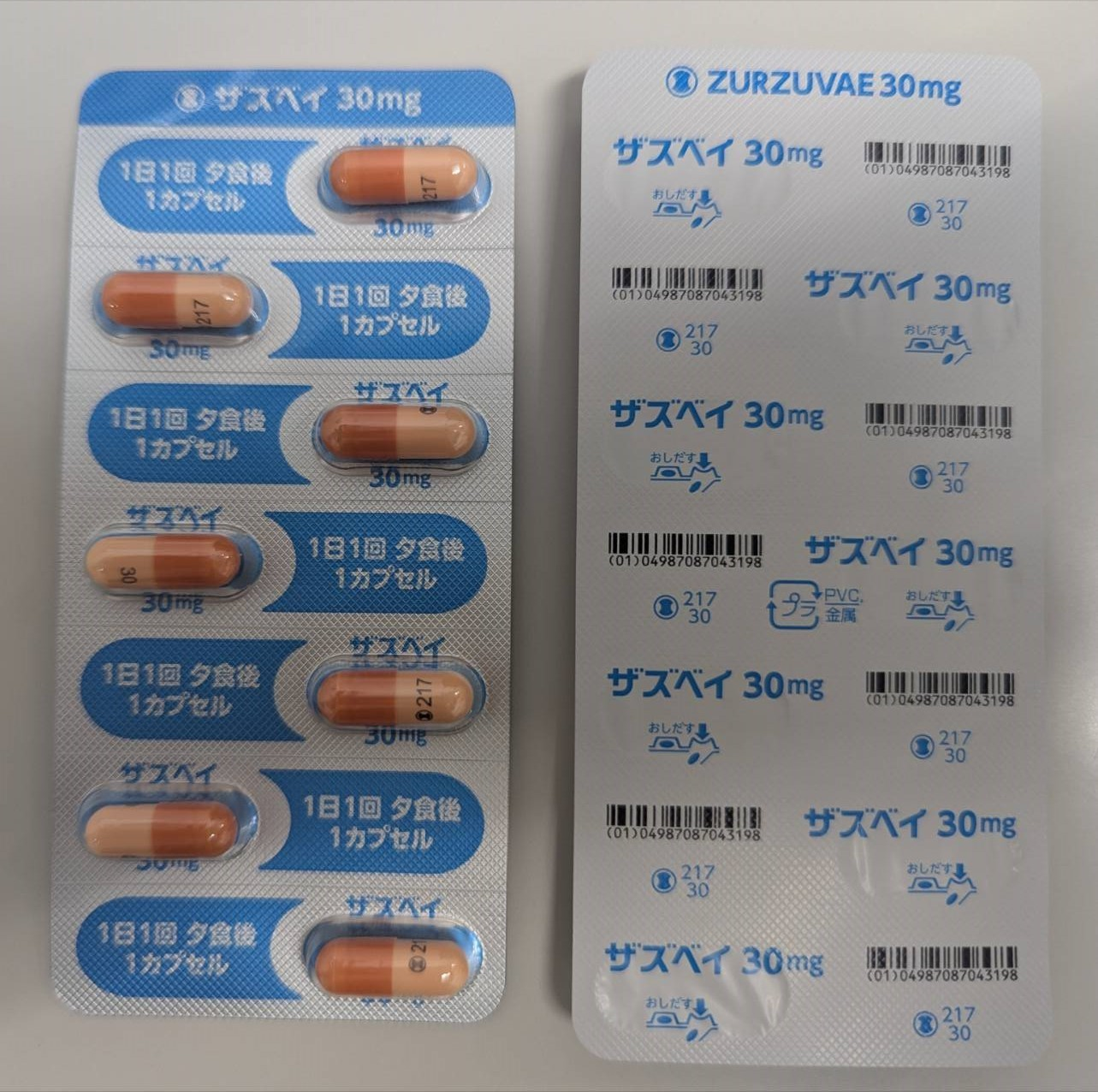
The Japanese blister pack for Zurzuvae.

Zuranolone is indicated for the treatment of postpartum depression in the United States and for the treatment of major depressive disorder in Japan. It was not approved for major depressive disorder in the United States.

The efficacy of zuranolone for the treatment of postpartum depression in adults was demonstrated in two randomized, double-blind, placebo-controlled, multicenter studies. The trial participants were women with postpartum depression who met the Diagnostic and Statistical Manual of Mental Disorders criteria for a major depressive episode and whose symptoms began in the third trimester or within four weeks of delivery. In study 1, participants received 50 mg of zuranolone or placebo once daily in the evening for 14 days. In study 2, participants received another zuranolone product that was approximately equal to 40 mg of zuranolone or placebo, also for 14 days. Participants in both studies were monitored for at least four weeks after the 14-day treatment. The primary endpoint of both studies was the change in depressive symptoms using the total score from the 17-item Hamilton depression rating scale (HAMD-17), measured at day 15. Participants in the zuranolone groups showed significantly more improvement in their symptoms compared to those in the placebo groups. The treatment effect was maintained at day 42—four weeks after the last dose of zuranolone.

== Adverse effects ==
The most common side effects include drowsiness, dizziness, diarrhea, fatigue, and urinary tract infection.

The US prescribing information contains a boxed warning noting that zuranolone can impact a person's ability to drive and perform other potentially hazardous activities. The use of zuranolone may cause suicidal thoughts and behavior. Zuranolone may also cause fetal harm.

== History ==
Zuranolone was developed as an improvement on the intravenously administered neurosteroid brexanolone, with high oral bioavailability and a biological half-life suitable for once-daily administration. Its half-life is around 16 to 23 hours, compared to approximately 9 hours for brexanolone.

Zuranolone was approved for the treatment of postpartum depression in the United States in August 2023 and for the treatment of major depressive disorder in Japan in March 2026. It was not approved for major depressive disorder in the United States.

== Society and culture ==
=== Names ===
Zuranolone is the International Nonproprietary Name (INN). The drug is sold under the brand name Zurzuvae.

=== Legal status ===
Zuranolone was approved by the U.S. Food and Drug Administration (FDA) for the treatment of postpartum depression in August 2023. The FDA granted the application for zuranolone priority review and fast track designations. Approval of Zurzuvae was granted to Sage Therapeutics, Inc. Zuranolone has also been under development for the treatment of major depressive disorder, but the application for this use was given a Complete Response Letter by the FDA due to insufficient evidence of effectiveness.

In the United States, zuranolone is a Schedule IV controlled substance.

In July 2025, the Committee for Medicinal Products for Human Use of the European Medicines Agency adopted a positive opinion, recommending the granting of a marketing authorization for the medicinal product Zurzuvae, intended for the treatment of adults with postpartum depression. The applicant for this medicinal product is Biogen Netherlands B.V. Zuranolone was authorized for medical use in the European Union in September 2025.

== Research ==
In a randomized, placebo-controlled phase III trial to assess its efficacy and safety for the treatment of major depressive disorder, subjects in the zuranolone group (50 mg oral zuranolone once daily for 14 days) experienced statistically significant and sustained improvements in depressive symptoms (as measured by HAM-D score) throughout the treatment and follow-up periods of the study.

Other investigational applications include insomnia, bipolar depression, essential tremor, and Parkinson's disease.

== See also ==
- List of investigational antidepressants
- List of investigational bipolar disorder drugs
- List of investigational insomnia drugs
