= Maria Dorota Majewska =

Polish neuroscientist

- Born: Maria Dorota Czajkowska; 1949 (age 76–77); Zgierz, Poland
- Education: MS in Biochemistry and Biophysics, University of Lodz, 1971; PhD in Neurochemistry, Institute of Experimental and Clinical Medicine, Polish Academy of Sciences, Warsaw, 1979.
- Known for: Neurosteroids function in brain: modulation of GABAA receptors; autism biomarker research; addiction research.
- Awards: Professor of Medical Sciences, awarded by the President of Poland, 2007; Marie Skłodowska-Curie Excellence Chair in Neuroscience of the European Union (2006–2009)
- Scientific career
- Fields: Neuroscience
- Workplaces: Institute for Experimental and Clinical Medicine, Warsaw; University of Missouri; Harvard Medical School; National Institute of Mental Health; National Institute on Drug Abuse; National Institute on Alcohol Abuse and Alcoholism; INSERM – French National Institute of Health and Medical Research; Georgetown University School of Medicine; Cardinal Stefan Wyszyński University, Warsaw; Institute of Psychiatry and Neurology, Warsaw.

Maria Dorota Majewska (publishing in Polish also as Maria Dorota Czajkowska-Majewska) is a Polish American neuroscientist whose research has focused on endogenous neurosteroids, mechanisms of brain injury during ischemia and anoxemia, biomedical aspects of alcohol and cocaine abuse and neurosteroid profiles and mercury biomarkers in children with autism spectrum disorder. She held the Marie Skłodowska- Curie Excellence Chair of the European Union (2006–2009) and received the Polish tytuł profesora (presidential professorship), a national lifetime academic title awarded by the President of Poland. Her earlier work at the U.S. National Institute of Mental Health on GABA_{A} receptor modulation by neurosteroid metabolites has been cited in later research related to development of neurosteroid-based treatments for postpartum depression, including brexanolone and zuranolone.

== Early life and education ==
Majewska was born in Zgierz, Poland, into a family of schoolteachers Zofia and Marian Czajkowski. She graduated from Stanisław Staszic High School in Zgierz in 1966. In 1971, she received an M.Sc. in biochemistry and biophysics cum laude from the University of Łódź. She earned her Ph.D. in neurochemistry from the Polish Academy of Sciences in Warsaw in 1979.

== Academic career ==
She conducted her research at several biomedical institutions including: the Institute for Experimental and Clinical Medicine in Warsaw, Poland (now the Mossakowski Medical Research Institute, Polish Academy of Sciences), the University of Missouri (Department of Biological Chemistry, Columbia, MO); Harvard Medical SchoolDepartment of Biological Chemistry, McLean Hospital, Belmont, MA); National Institute of Mental Health (Section on Preclinical Studies, Clinical Neuroscience Branch, NIMH, Bethesda, MD), the National Institute on Drug Abuse (Laboratory of Neuropharmacology, Addiction Research Center, NIDA, Baltimore, MD), the National Institute on Alcohol Abuse and Alcoholism (Section of Neurochemistry, Laboratory of Clinical Studies, NIAAA, Bethesda, MD).

In 1988, she was a visiting scientist at INSERM (the French National Institute of Health and Medical Research) at Université de Paris Sud (Endocrinology Department of Étienne Émile Baulieu) and collaborated with the Georgetown University School of Medicine (FIDIA–Georgetown Institute for Neuroscience, Washington, DC).

Between 2007 and 2009, she held Marie Skłodowska‑Curie Excellence Chair of the European Union in Neuroscience at the Institute of Psychiatry and Neurology in Warsaw, leading research sponsored by the European Commission (FP7) entitled "Neurobiology of Autism: Role of Steroids and Mercury" (ASTER), MEXC-CT-2006-042371.

From 2010 to 2015, she served as a visiting professor at Cardinal Stefan Wyszyński University in Warsaw.

== Neurosteroid modulation of GABA_{A} receptors ==
In 1985, while working at the NIAAA, she published an article stating that certain steroid hormones interact directly with the GABAA receptors in the brain and alter their function. Subsequently at the NIMH she continued this line of research and in 1986, while at the U.S. National Institute of Mental Health, Majewska and collaborators reported that several endogenous steroid metabolites—including allopregnanolone and tetrahydrodeoxycorticosterone—act as potent positive allosteric modulators of the GABAA receptor complex, thus enhancing their inhibitory actions in the brain, whereas pregnenolone sulfate acts as negative modulator of these receptors, exerting an opposing, neuroexcitatory effect in the brain.

The findings, published in Science, were noted in contemporaneous commentary as demonstrating that major progesterone metabolites can strongly enhance GABAA receptor function, suggesting a molecular mechanism through which steroid hormones may influence mood, stress responses, and other behavioral states.

Majewska's 1987 invited review in Integrative Psychiatry on steroid actions in neurons (with commentaries from S. Schwartz-Giblin, D. W. Pfaff, H. M. Lahmeyer, M. N. Starkman, M. A. Kling, F. K. Goodwin, P. W. Gold, W.Kostowski) further developed the concept that steroid hormones—among the most dynamically fluctuating biological factors—could regulate neuronal excitability through direct effects on GABA_{A} receptors.

Because GABA is the principal inhibitory neurotransmitter controlling central nervous system excitability, this mechanism offered a potential explanation for a wide range of psychophysiological phenomena, including stress, anxiety, depression, aggression, and memory processes.

== Translation of basic research: Neurosteroid-based therapeutics ==
Over the four decades following the 1986 NIMH study, neurosteroids came to be recognized as key modulators of brain physiology and pathology.

Subsequent research in neuroscience and neuropharmacology clarified the biosynthesis of neurosteroids from cholesterol within the brain and documented their diverse roles in regulating neuronal excitability, stress responses, affective states, and inflammatory processes. The discovery of neurosteroid modulation of GABA_{A} receptors in the 1980s at the NIMH is recognized as the conceptual basis for the development of the first neurosteroid-based psychiatric treatments.

Brexanolone, a synthetic formulation of allopregnanolone, developed by Sage Therapeutics, received FDA approval in 2019 as the first medication specifically indicated for postpartum depression. Its oral analogue, zuranolone, was approved in 2023 as the first oral neurosteroid treatment for postpartum depression.

Scientific American (2025) described zuranolone as a "game changing" treatment offering rapid relief for postpartum depression.

Most recent publications and commentaries citing papers by Majewska and colleagues describe neurosteroid‑based compounds as an emerging therapeutic class of rapid-acting medications under investigation for many neuropsychiatric and neurological conditions, including depressive and anxiety disorders, epilepsy, tic disorders, Alzheimer's disease, and Parkinson's disease.

== Translation - Addiction research ==
During her tenure at the Medications Development Division, NIDA, Majewska oversaw components of the institute's program for developing new pharmacotherapies for substance use disorders.

As part of this work, she proposed baclofen—a GABAB receptor agonist that inhibits the release of several neurotransmitters—as a candidate medication for reducing drug craving, based on preclinical evidence that baclofen suppresses dopaminergic activation and attenuates cocaine induced behavioral sensitization.

A clinical research group at the Los Angeles Addiction Treatment and Research Center subsequently conducted the first human trial of baclofen for cocaine dependence, with Majewska as a coauthor on the publication in Neuropsychopharmacology (1998).

Baclofen has since become a subject of extensive research in addiction medicine, including its adoption in France as an approved pharmacotherapy for alcohol abuse disorder.

Recent reviews note that baclofen remains one of the few GABAB-ergic agents with clinical evidence for reducing craving in substance use disorders.

== Autism-related research ==
Within the ASTER project of The European Commission at the Institute of Psychiatry and Neurology (IPiN) in Warsaw, Majewska and 16 collaborators conducted preclinical rat studies on the developmental effects of thiomersal at the Department of Pharmacology and Physiology of the Nervous System and clinical studies at the Clinic of Child and Adolescent Psychiatry, examining steroid profiles and mercury biomarkers in children with autism spectrum disorder (ASD).

Among their 20 papers on the subject, the publications in 2010 and 2014 reported elevated salivary levels of multiple steroid classes – particularly androgens – in patients with ASD, as well as differences in hair mercury content in these patients, suggesting impaired mercury elimination in some ASD subgroups.

Recent synthetic reviews of neurosteroid research in psychiatric and neurological disorders cite Majewska's team work among evidence for altered steroid signaling in ASD and discuss potential therapeutic implications for neurosteroid-modulating agents.

== Popular science ==
Majewska has written many popular neuroscience articles for the Polish journals Polityka and Dziś, as well as two popular science books in Polish.

== Science-related activities ==
From 2000 to 2001 she served as president of the Polish American Health Association (PAHA) in Washington, D.C.

== Scientific debate with the Polish Society for Vaccinology (2008) ==
In 2008 Majewska organized an international scientific conference on vaccinations and neurodevelopmental disorders at the University of Warsaw, funded by the Institute of Psychiatry and Neurology, the Polish Ministry of Science, and the European Commission (ASTER program).

She then submitted a memorandum to the Polish Ministry of Health recommending cautious reduction of the number of vaccine doses in the first year of life and removal of thimerosal, in line with practices already adopted in several European countries.

The Polish Society for Vaccinology (PTW) published a critical response based on epidemiological data.

Majewska replied with a detailed scientific rebuttal referencing preclinical models and international debates on thimerosal.

The scientific discussion was later taken up by press, by social science outlets as well as by parents/activist websites, both pro- and anti-vaccine, leading to oversimplified and sometimes distorted representations of arguments of both partisan sides in the blogosphere of influencers. International decisions — including the complete removal of thimerosal from all U.S. vaccines in 2025 — indicate that Majewska's 2008 proposals were part of a broader global precautionary trend. Sure enough, in Poland the last thimerosal‑containing vaccines for children were soon withdrawn, in 2011; Denmark and Sweden had discontinued such preparations already in the early 1990s.
