= AZD-3043 =

Identifiers
- IUPAC name: propyl 2-[4-[2-(diethylamino)-2-oxoethoxy]-3-ethoxyphenyl]acetate
- CAS Number: 579494-66-9
- PubChem CID: 10286834
- DrugBank: DB12576
- ChemSpider: 8462303
- UNII: 372AB76LQL
- ChEBI: CHEBI:755337
- ChEMBL: ChEMBL3354350
- CompTox Dashboard (EPA): DTXSID601339521
- ECHA InfoCard: 100.207.742

Chemical and physical data
- Formula: C_{19}H_{29}NO_{5}
- Molar mass: 351.443 g·mol^{−1}
- 3D model (JSmol): Interactive image
- SMILES: CCCOC(=O)CC1=CC(=C(C=C1)OCC(=O)N(CC)CC)OCC
- InChI: InChI=1S/C19H29NO5/c1-5-11-24-19(22)13-15-9-10-16(17(12-15)23-8-4)25-14-18(21)20(6-2)7-3/h9-10,12H,5-8,11,13-14H2,1-4H3; Key:QPUVKSKJCNGSGT-UHFFFAOYSA-N

AZD-3043 (THRX-918661) is an ultra short-acting phenylacetate general anesthetic. It is closely related to propanidid which was marketed for clinical use in the 1960s and 1970s but withdrawn due to cases of anaphylactic reaction, though it is now thought that these were more likely caused by other components of the injectable formulation rather than the drug itself. AZD-3043 is slightly more potent than propanidid but otherwise has similar activity. It acts as a potent positive allosteric modulator of GABAA receptors with a binding site overlapping with that of both propofol and benzodiazepines, even though its chemical structure is quite different. Its effects are rapidly terminated by metabolic cleavage of the labile ester substituent, resulting in a short duration of action and quick recovery period. Research into this family continues and numerous related compounds have been developed with similar properties.

== See also ==
- Etomidate
