= Alfaxolone/alfadolone =

Pharmaceutical combination

Combination of
- Alfaxalone: General anaesthetic
- Alfadolone: Hypnotic

Clinical data
- Trade names: Althesin, Saffan
- Other names: CT-1341, Alphadione, Alphathesin, Aurantex, Alfatesine
- Routes of administration: Intravenous

Identifiers
- CAS Number: 23930-19-0; 14107-37-0
- PubChem CID: 24732
- UNII: BD07M97B2A; OE1C96974E
- CompTox Dashboard (EPA): DTXSID001001405

Alfaxolone/alfadolone (brand names Althesin (human), Saffan (veterinary)) is a short acting intravenous anesthetic agent. It was withdrawn from the market due to severe drug reactions. It is composed of a 3:1 mixture of alfaxalone and alfadolone, two neurosteroids.

== Mechanism ==
Alfaxolone/alfadolone is short-duration, intravenous anesthetic made from a combination of two steroidal compounds, alfaxalone and alfadolone, of which the former is the primary anesthetic agent. Alfadolone acts to increase the solubility of the mixture in which it is dissolved, a polyethylated castor oil adjuvant. Anesthetic efficacy is achieved by allosteric potentiation of the GABA_{A} chloride channel to produce 'fast' synaptic inhibition.

== Clinical use ==
Alfaxolone/alfadolone is short-acting, rapid onset anesthetic which has been used for out-patient surgery. It does not have significant analgesic properties and anesthesia has often been maintained with inhalational anesthetics such as halothane. These have also been accompanied by neuromuscular blockers. Procedures carried out under this drug are greatly varied and have included orthopedic, gynecological, dental and urological surgery. Notable effects include a drop in arterial and venous pressure in a quarter of patients; this is accompanied by a compensatory mild tachycardia in around 35% of those observed in a population skewed towards geriatrics.

Cremophor EL (Polyoxyl 35 Castor Oil, a surfactant and derivative of castor oil) was the solubilizing agent (excipient / additive) of Althesin.

A 2001 study found that Cremophor EL, when previously used as a solubilizing agent in lipid emulsions, was responsible for severe anaphylactoid reactions. Drugs using it were reformulated to use other emulsifiers. Alfaxolone/alfadolone has been re-branded as "Saffan" and is available for use in veterinary anaesthesia.
