= Steroid hormone =

Substance with biological function

- Drug class
- Estradiol, an important estrogen steroid hormone in both women and men.

Class identifiers
- Synonyms: Adrenal steroid; Gonadal steroid
- Use: Various
- Biological target: Steroid hormone receptors
- Chemical class: Steroidal; Nonsteroidal

Legal status

A steroid hormone is a steroid that acts as a hormone. Steroid hormones can be grouped into two classes: corticosteroids (typically made in the adrenal cortex, hence cortico-) and sex steroids (typically made in the gonads or placenta). Within those two classes are five types according to the receptors to which they bind: glucocorticoids and mineralocorticoids (both corticosteroids) and androgens, estrogens, and progestogens (sex steroids). Vitamin D derivatives are a sixth closely related hormone system with homologous receptors. They have some of the characteristics of true steroids as receptor ligands.

Steroid hormones help control metabolism, inflammation, immune functions, salt and water balance, development of sexual characteristics, and the ability to withstand injury and illness. The term steroid describes both hormones produced by the body and artificially produced medications that duplicate the action for the naturally occurring steroids.

== Synthesis ==
Steroidogenesis with enzymes and intermediates.

The natural steroid hormones are generally synthesized from cholesterol in the gonads and adrenal glands. These forms of hormones are lipids. They can pass through the cell membrane as they are fat-soluble, and then bind to steroid hormone receptors (which may be nuclear or cytosolic depending on the steroid hormone) to bring about changes within the cell. Steroid hormones are generally carried in the blood, bound to specific carrier proteins such as sex hormone-binding globulin or corticosteroid-binding globulin. Further conversions and catabolism occurs in the liver, in other "peripheral" tissues, and in the target tissues.

Production rates, secretion rates, clearance rates, and blood levels of major sex hormones
Sex	Sex hormone	Reproductive phase	Blood production rate	Gonadal secretion rate	Metabolic clearance rate	Reference range (serum levels)	
Sex	Sex hormone	Reproductive phase	Blood production rate	Gonadal secretion rate	Metabolic clearance rate	Molar concentration	Mass concentration
Men	Androstenedione	–	2.8 mg/day	1.6 mg/day	2200 L/day	2.8–7.3 nmol/L	80–210 ng/dL
Men	Testosterone	–	6.5 mg/day	6.2 mg/day	950 L/day	6.9–34.7 nmol/L	200–1000 ng/dL
Men	Estrone	–	150 μg/day	110 μg/day	2050 L/day	37–250 pmol/L	10–70 pg/mL
Men	Estradiol	–	60 μg/day	50 μg/day	1600 L/day	<37–210 pmol/L	10–57 pg/mL
Men	Estrone sulfate	–	80 μg/day	Insignificant	167 L/day	600–2500 pmol/L	200–900 pg/mL
Women	Androstenedione	–	3.2 mg/day	2.8 mg/day	2000 L/day	3.1–12.2 nmol/L	89–350 ng/dL
Women	Testosterone	–	190 μg/day	60 μg/day	500 L/day	0.7–2.8 nmol/L	20–81 ng/dL
Women	Estrone	Follicular phase	110 μg/day	80 μg/day	2200 L/day	110–400 pmol/L	30–110 pg/mL
Women	Estrone	Luteal phase	260 μg/day	150 μg/day	2200 L/day	310–660 pmol/L	80–180 pg/mL
Women	Estrone	Postmenopause	40 μg/day	Insignificant	1610 L/day	22–230 pmol/L	6–60 pg/mL
Women	Estradiol	Follicular phase	90 μg/day	80 μg/day	1200 L/day	<37–360 pmol/L	10–98 pg/mL
Women	Estradiol	Luteal phase	250 μg/day	240 μg/day	1200 L/day	699–1250 pmol/L	190–341 pg/mL
Women	Estradiol	Postmenopause	6 μg/day	Insignificant	910 L/day	<37–140 pmol/L	10–38 pg/mL
Women	Estrone sulfate	Follicular phase	100 μg/day	Insignificant	146 L/day	700–3600 pmol/L	250–1300 pg/mL
Women	Estrone sulfate	Luteal phase	180 μg/day	Insignificant	146 L/day	1100–7300 pmol/L	400–2600 pg/mL
Women	Progesterone	Follicular phase	2 mg/day	1.7 mg/day	2100 L/day	0.3–3 nmol/L	0.1–0.9 ng/mL
Women	Progesterone	Luteal phase	25 mg/day	24 mg/day	2100 L/day	19–45 nmol/L	6–14 ng/mL
Notes and sources Notes: "The concentration of a steroid in the circulation is determined by the rate at which it is secreted from glands, the rate of metabolism of precursor or prehormones into the steroid, and the rate at which it is extracted by tissues and metabolized. The secretion rate of a steroid refers to the total secretion of the compound from a gland per unit time. Secretion rates have been assessed by sampling the venous effluent from a gland over time and subtracting out the arterial and peripheral venous hormone concentration. The metabolic clearance rate of a steroid is defined as the volume of blood that has been completely cleared of the hormone per unit time. The production rate of a steroid hormone refers to entry into the blood of the compound from all possible sources, including secretion from glands and conversion of prohormones into the steroid of interest. At steady state, the amount of hormone entering the blood from all sources will be equal to the rate at which it is being cleared (metabolic clearance rate) multiplied by blood concentration (production rate = metabolic clearance rate × concentration). If there is little contribution of prohormone metabolism to the circulating pool of steroid, then the production rate will approximate the secretion rate." Sources: See template.

=== Synthetic steroids and sterols ===
A variety of synthetic steroids and sterols have also been contrived. Most are steroids, but some nonsteroidal molecules can interact with the steroid receptors because of a similarity of shape. Some synthetic steroids are weaker or stronger than the natural steroids whose receptors they activate.

Some examples of synthetic steroid hormones:

- Glucocorticoids: alclometasone, prednisone, dexamethasone, triamcinolone, cortisone
- Mineralocorticoid: fludrocortisone
- Vitamin D: dihydrotachysterol
- Androgens: oxandrolone, oxabolone, nandrolone (also known as anabolic-androgenic steroids or simply anabolic steroids)
- Oestrogens: diethylstilbestrol (DES) and ethinyl estradiol (EE)
- Progestins: norethisterone, medroxyprogesterone acetate, hydroxyprogesterone caproate.

Some steroid antagonists:

- Androgen: cyproterone acetate
- Progestins: mifepristone, gestrinone

== Transport ==
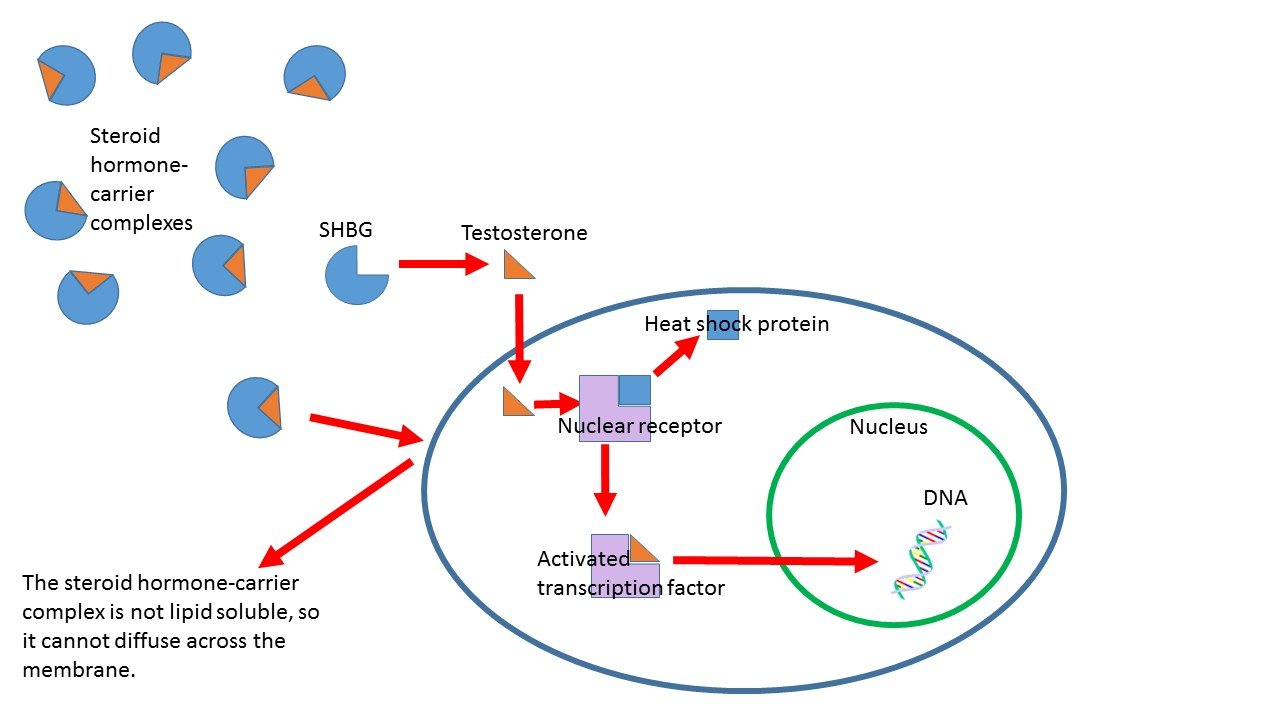
Free hormone hypothesis 2

Steroid hormones are transported through the blood by being bound to carrier proteins—serum proteins that bind them and increase the hormones' solubility in water. Some examples are sex hormone-binding globulin (SHBG), corticosteroid-binding globulin, and albumin. Most studies say that hormones can only affect cells when they are not bound by serum proteins. In order to be active, steroid hormones must free themselves from their blood-solubilizing proteins and either bind to extracellular receptors, or passively cross the cell membrane and bind to nuclear receptors. This idea is known as the free hormone hypothesis. This idea is shown in Figure 1 to the right.

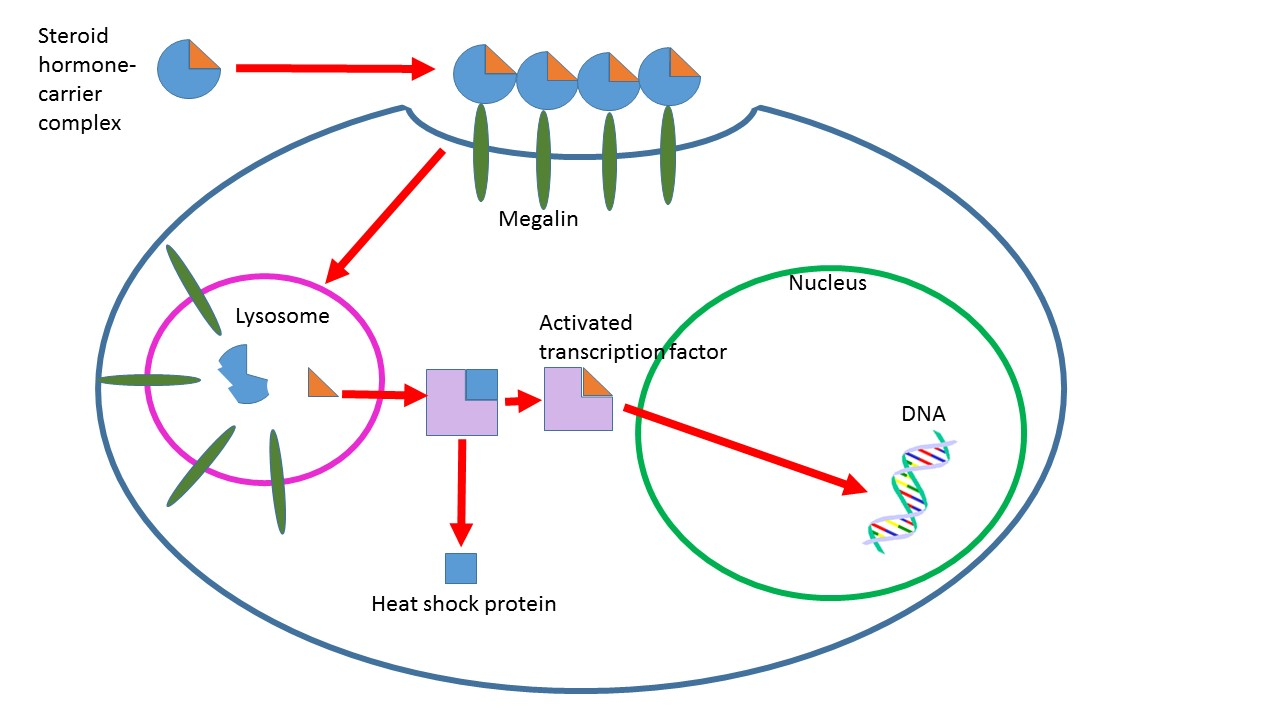
This shows a possible pathway through which steroid hormones are endocytosed and proceed to affect cells via a genomic pathway.

One study has found that these steroid-carrier complexes are bound by megalin, a membrane receptor, and are then taken into cells via endocytosis. One possible pathway is that once inside the cell these complexes are taken to the lysosome, where the carrier protein is degraded and the steroid hormone is released into the cytoplasm of the target cell. The hormone then follows a genomic pathway of action. This process is shown in Figure 2 to the right. The role of endocytosis in steroid hormone transport is not well understood and is under further investigation.

In order for steroid hormones to cross the lipid bilayer of cells, they must overcome energetic barriers that would prevent their entering or exiting the membrane. Gibbs free energy is an important concept here. These hormones, which are all derived from cholesterol, have hydrophilic functional groups at either end and hydrophobic carbon backbones. When steroid hormones are entering membranes free energy barriers exist when the functional groups are entering the hydrophobic interior of membrane, but it is energetically favorable for the hydrophobic core of these hormones to enter lipid bilayers. These energy barriers and wells are reversed for hormones exiting membranes. Steroid hormones easily enter and exit the membrane at physiologic conditions. They have been shown experimentally to cross membranes near a rate of 20 μm/s, depending on the hormone.

Though it is energetically more favorable for hormones to be in the membrane than in the ECF or ICF, they do in fact leave the membrane once they have entered it. This is an important consideration because cholesterol—the precursor to all steroid hormones—does not leave the membrane once it has embedded itself inside. The difference between cholesterol and these hormones is that cholesterol is in a much larger negative Gibb's free energy well once inside the membrane, as compared to these hormones. This is because the aliphatic tail on cholesterol has a very favorable interaction with the interior of lipid bilayers.

== Mechanisms of action and effects ==
There are many different mechanisms through which steroid hormones affect their target cells. All of these different pathways can be classified as having either a genomic effect or a non-genomic effect. Genomic pathways are slow and result in altering transcription levels of certain proteins in the cell; non-genomic pathways are much faster.

=== Genomic pathways ===
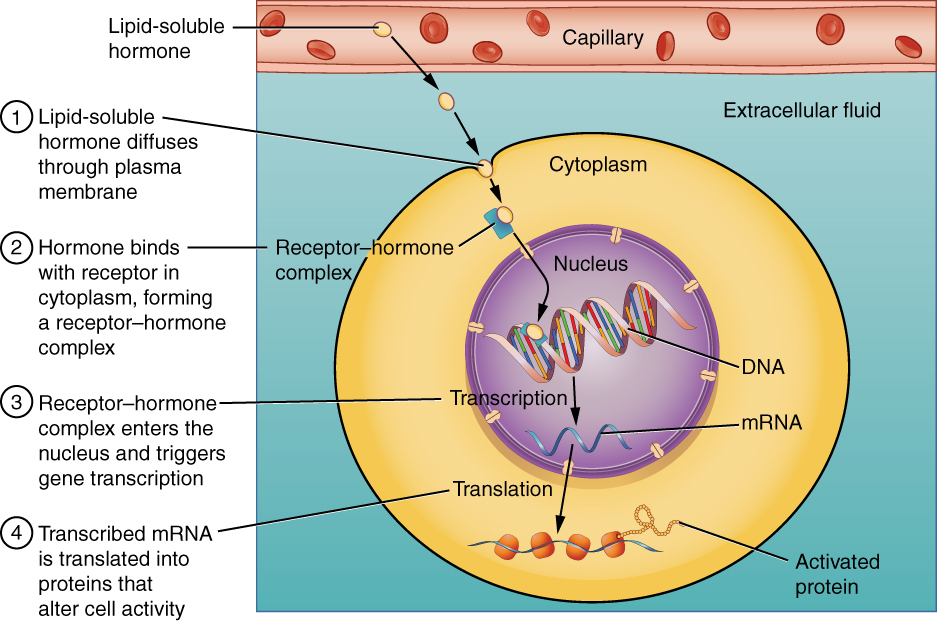
Flowchart showing the binding of a steroid hormone to a target cell

The first identified mechanisms of steroid hormone action were the genomic effects. In this pathway, the free hormones first pass through the cell membrane because they are fat soluble. In the cytoplasm, the steroid may or may not undergo an enzyme-mediated alteration such as reduction, hydroxylation, or aromatization. Then the steroid binds to a specific steroid hormone receptor, also known as a nuclear receptor, which is a large metalloprotein.

Upon steroid binding, many kinds of steroid receptors dimerize: two receptor subunits join together to form one functional DNA-binding unit that can enter the cell nucleus. Once in the nucleus, the steroid-receptor ligand complex binds to specific DNA sequences and induces transcription of its target genes.

=== Non-genomic pathways ===
Because non-genomic pathways include any mechanism that is not a genomic effect, there are various non-genomic pathways. However, all of these pathways are mediated by some type of steroid hormone receptor found at the plasma membrane. Ion channels, transporters, G-protein coupled receptors (GPCR), and membrane fluidity have all been shown to be affected by steroid hormones. Of these, GPCR linked proteins are the most common. For more information on these proteins and pathways, visit the steroid hormone receptor page.

== See also ==
- List of investigational sex-hormonal agents
- Membrane steroid receptor
