= Kolliphor EL =

Brand name for polyethoxylated castor oil

Kolliphor EL, formerly known as Cremophor EL, is the registered trademark of BASF Corp. for its version of polyethoxylated castor oil. It is prepared by reacting 35 moles of ethylene oxide with each mole of castor oil. The resulting product is a mixture (CAS number 61791-12-6): the major component is the material in which the hydroxyl groups of the castor oil triglyceride have been ethoxylated with ethylene oxide to form polyethylene glycol ethers. Minor components are the polyethyelene glycol esters of ricinoleic acid, polyethylene glycols and polyethylene glycol ethers of glycerol. Kolliphor EL is a synthetic, nonionic surfactant used to stabilize emulsions of nonpolar materials in water.

Kolliphor EL is an excipient or additive in drugs. Therapeutically, modern drugs are rarely given in a pure chemical state, so most active ingredients are combined with excipients or additives such as Kolliphor EL.

== Uses ==
- Miconazole, anti-fungal
- Paclitaxel (Taxol), anti-cancer
- Aci-Jel (acetic acid / oxyquinoline / ricinoleic acid - vaginal)
- Sandimmune (cyclosporine injection, USP)
- Nelfinavir mesylate, HIV protease inhibitor
- Propofol, intravenous anaesthetic agent, originally solublized with Cremophor EL in trials; later approved with a lipid emulsion
- Diazepam injection; superseded by lipid emulsion alternative (Diazemuls)
- Vitamin K injection
- Ixabepilone, anti-cancer

== Side effects ==
Allergic reactions to Taxol are most often allergic reactions to Kolliphor EL; symptoms include tightness in the chest, shortness of breath, and similar reactions consistent with severe anaphylactic reactions. Although many anti-allergens including corticosteroids and Benadryl may be administered before chemotherapy, they are not always sufficient to prevent the severe reaction to Kolliphor EL.

Allergic reaction should not be confused with the normal side effects of Taxol. The allergic reaction is usually immediate, similar to severe allergic reactions typical of other allergens.

BASF offers a purified, injectable version of Kolliphor EL, known as Kolliphor ELP.

== See also ==
- Castor oil
