= Ganaxolone =

Chemical compound

Clinical data
- Trade names: Ztalmy
- Other names: GNX; CCD-1042; 3β-Methyl-5α-pregnan-3α-ol-20-one; 3α-Hydroxy-3β-methyl-5α-pregnan-20-one
- License data: US DailyMed: Ganaxolone
- Routes of administration: By mouth
- Drug class: Neurosteroid
- ATC code: N03AX27 (WHO)

Legal status
- Legal status: US: Schedule V; EU: Rx-only

Identifiers
- IUPAC name: 1-[(3R,5S,8R,9S,10S,13S,14S,17S)-3-Hydroxy-3,10,13-trimethyl-1,2,4,5,6,7,8,9,11,12,14,15,16,17-tetradecahydrocyclopenta[a]phenanthren-17-yl]ethanone
- CAS Number: 38398-32-2
- PubChem CID: 6918305
- DrugBank: DB05087
- ChemSpider: 5293511
- UNII: 98WI44OHIQ
- KEGG: D04300
- ChEMBL: ChEMBL161915
- CompTox Dashboard (EPA): DTXSID6046503
- ECHA InfoCard: 100.210.937

Chemical and physical data
- Formula: C_{22}H_{36}O_{2}
- Molar mass: 332.528 g·mol^{−1}
- 3D model (JSmol): Interactive image
- SMILES: CC(=O)[C@H]1CC[C@@H]2[C@@]1(CC[C@H]3[C@H]2CC[C@@H]4[C@@]3(CC[C@@](C4)(C)O)C)C
- InChI: InChI=1S/C22H36O2/c1-14(23)17-7-8-18-16-6-5-15-13-20(2,24)11-12-21(15,3)19(16)9-10-22(17,18)4/h15-19,24H,5-13H2,1-4H3/t15-,16-,17+,18-,19-,20+,21-,22+/m0/s1; Key:PGTVWKLGGCQMBR-FLBATMFCSA-N

Ganaxolone, sold under the brand name Ztalmy, is a medication used to treat seizures in people with cyclin-dependent kinase-like 5 (CDKL5) deficiency disorder. Ganaxolone is a neuroactive steroid gamma-aminobutyric acid (GABA) A receptor positive modulator.

The most common side effects of treatment with ganaxolone include somnolence (sleepiness), fever, excessive saliva or drooling, and seasonal allergy.

Ganaxolone was approved for medical use in the United States in March 2022, and in the European Union in July 2023. The US Food and Drug Administration (FDA) considers it to be a first-in-class medication.

== Medical uses ==
Ganaxolone is indicated for the treatment of seizures associated with cyclin-dependent kinase-like 5 (CDKL5) deficiency disorder.

== Pharmacology ==
=== Mechanism of action ===
Ganaxolone is a synthetic analog of the endogenous neurosteroid allopregnanolone and acts as a positive allosteric modulator of GABAA receptors.[13] Like other neurosteroids, it binds to specific allosteric sites on the receptor and enhances chloride ion flux, producing neuronal hyperpolarization and increased inhibitory signaling.[3][10][11] Electrophysiological and animal studies show that ganaxolone potentiates both synaptic (phasic) and extrasynaptic (tonic) GABAA receptors, including δ subunit–containing receptors, thereby raising seizure threshold and limiting seizure propagation.[3] This mechanism is consistent with the established actions of allopregnanolone and other pregnane neurosteroids.

The neurosteroid modulation of GABAA receptors by progesterone-derived metabolites such as allopregnanolone was first characterized in the mid-1980s by Majewska and colleagues, who demonstrated potent enhancement of GABAergic inhibition by these endogenous steroids (1986–1987). Subsequent review articles in the late 1980s and early 1990s further established this mechanism, providing the conceptual basis for later synthetic analogs such as ganaxolone.

Ganaxolone is thought to modulate both synaptic and extrasynaptic GABA_{A} receptors to normalize over-excited neurons. Ganaxolone's activation of the extrasynaptic receptor is an additional mechanism that provides stabilizing effects that potentially differentiates it from other drugs that increase GABA signaling.

Ganaxolone binds to allosteric sites of the GABA_{A} receptor to modulate and open the chloride ion channel, resulting in a hyperpolarization of the neuron. This causes an inhibitory effect on neurotransmission, reducing the chance of a successful action potential (depolarization) from occurring.

It is unknown whether ganaxolone possesses significant hormonal activity in vivo, with a 2020 study finding evidence of in vitro binding to the membrane progesterone receptor.

== Chemistry ==
Other pregnane neurosteroids include endogenous metabolites such as allopregnanolone and pregnanolone (eltanolone), as well as synthetic analogs including alfaxolone, alfadolone, hydroxydione, minaxolone and renanolone. These compounds share the characteristic 5α‑reduced pregnane backbone and act as positive allosteric modulators of GABAA receptors, although they differ in potency, pharmacokinetics and clinical applications

== History ==
The FDA approved ganaxolone based on evidence from a single, double-blind, randomized, placebo-controlled study (Study 1, NCT03572933) of 101 participants with cyclin-dependent kinase-like 5 (CDKL5) deficiency disorder who were two years of age and older. The trial was conducted at 36 sites in 8 countries including Australia, France, Israel, Italy, Poland, Russian Federation, the United Kingdom, and the United States. Forty-four (40.7%) of the participants were from US sites. Safety was assessed from a pool of two clinical studies. These include the study of participants with cyclin-dependent kinase-like 5 deficiency disorder and a clinical study that included seven additional participants from a trial of ganaxolone in children and young adults.
