= BD1052 =

Chemical compound

Identifiers
- IUPAC name: N-[2-(3,4-Dichlorophenyl)ethyl]-N-2-propen-1-yl-1-pyrrolidineethanamine
- CAS Number: 138356-16-8
- PubChem CID: 9797436
- ChemSpider: 7973202
- UNII: 9SWF79BC2H
- CompTox Dashboard (EPA): DTXSID90430892

Chemical and physical data
- Formula: C_{17}H_{24}Cl_{2}N_{2}
- Molar mass: 327.29 g·mol^{−1}
- 3D model (JSmol): Interactive image
- SMILES: Clc1ccc(cc1Cl)CCN(CCN2CCCC2)C\C=C
- InChI: InChI=1S/C17H24Cl2N2/c1-2-8-20(12-13-21-9-3-4-10-21)11-7-15-5-6-16(18)17(19)14-15/h2,5-6,14H,1,3-4,7-13H2; Key:IKFDBDJFYBCATB-UHFFFAOYSA-N

BD1052 or N-[2-(3,4-dichlorophenyl)ethyl]-N-2-propen-1-yl-1-pyrrolidineethanamine is a selective sigma receptor agonist, with a reported binding affinity of K_{i} = 2 ± 0.5 nM for the sigma-1 receptor and 30 times selectivity over the sigma-2 receptor.

Consistent with other reported sigma receptor agonists, pretreating Swiss Webster mice with BD1052 significantly increases the behavioral toxicity of cocaine.

== See also ==
- BD1008
- BD1031
- LR132
