= BD1067 =

Chemical compound

Identifiers
- IUPAC name: N-[2-(3,4-dichlorophenyl)ethyl]-N-ethyl-1-pyrrolidineethanamine
- CAS Number: 138356-12-4
- PubChem CID: 9796923
- ChemSpider: 7972689
- UNII: B735YEI65V
- CompTox Dashboard (EPA): DTXSID601030389

Chemical and physical data
- Formula: C_{16}H_{24}Cl_{2}N_{2}
- Molar mass: 315.28 g·mol^{−1}
- 3D model (JSmol): Interactive image
- SMILES: CCN(CCC1=CC(=C(C=C1)Cl)Cl)CCN2CCCC2
- InChI: InChI=1S/C16H24Cl2N2/c1-2-19(11-12-20-8-3-4-9-20)10-7-14-5-6-15(17)16(18)13-14/h5-6,13H,2-4,7-12H2,1H3; Key:NMEAEGORKFOIDR-UHFFFAOYSA-N

BD1067 or N-[2-(3,4-dichlorophenyl)ethyl]-N-ethyl-1-pyrrolidineethanamine is a selective sigma receptor antagonist, with a reported binding affinity of K_{i} = 2 ± 0.5 nM for the sigma-1 receptor and greater than 19 times selectivity over the sigma-2 receptor.

Like other sigma receptor antagonists, pretreating Swiss Webster mice with BD1067 significantly attenuates the behavioral toxicity of cocaine.

== See also ==
- BD1008
- BD1031
- LR132
