= BD1063 =

Chemical compound

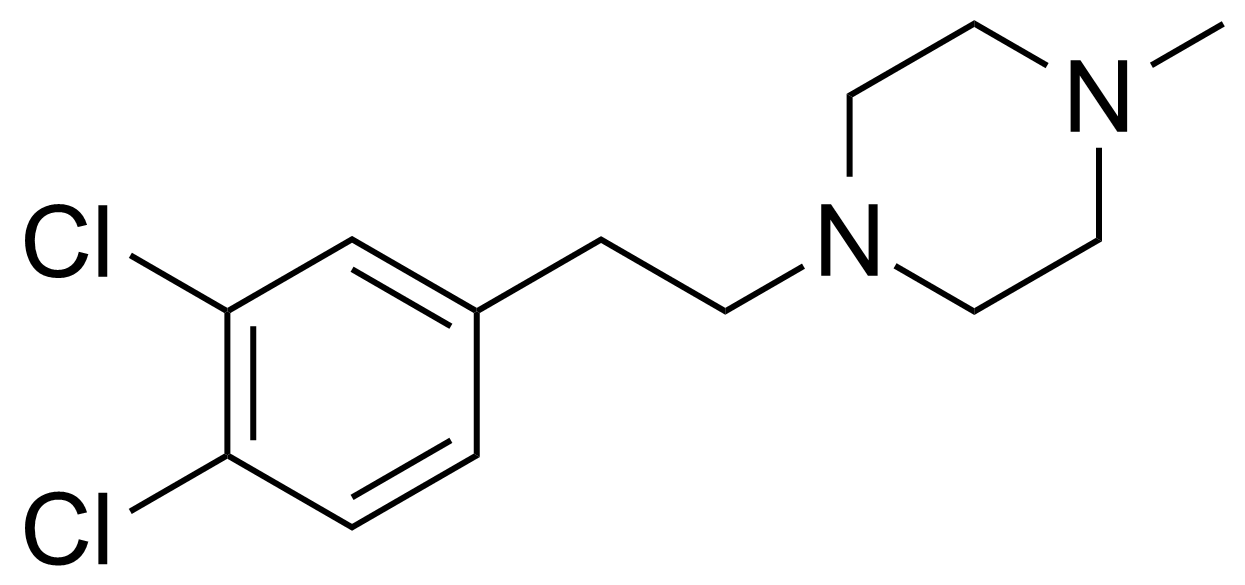

Identifiers
- IUPAC name: 1-[2-(3,4-dichlorophenyl)ethyl]-4-methylpiperazine
- CAS Number: 150208-28-9
- ChemSpider: 499765
- UNII: 5X4CA32SG5
- CompTox Dashboard (EPA): DTXSID70341674
- ECHA InfoCard: 100.229.843

Chemical and physical data
- Formula: C_{13}H_{18}Cl_{2}N_{2}
- Molar mass: 273.20 g·mol^{−1}
- 3D model (JSmol): Interactive image
- SMILES: CN1CCN(CC1)CCc2ccc(c(c2)Cl)Cl
- InChI: InChI=1S/C13H18Cl2N2/c1-16-6-8-17(9-7-16)5-4-11-2-3-12(14)13(15)10-11/h2-3,10H,4-9H2,1H3; Key:SUIZRDJCBVPASY-UHFFFAOYSA-N

BD1063 or 1-[2-(3,4-dichlorophenyl)ethyl]-4-methylpiperazine is a selective sigma receptor antagonist, with a reported binding affinity of K_{i} = 9 ± 1 nM for the sigma-1 receptor and more than 49 times selectivity over the sigma-2 receptor.

Consistent with other reported sigma receptor antagonists, pretreating Swiss Webster mice with BD1063 significantly decreases the convulsivity and lethality of cocaine.

In other animal studies, BD1063 blocks the effects of MDMA, and reduces alcohol intake in rodent models of alcoholism.

== See also ==
- BD1008
- BD1031
- LR132
