= SR-31742A =

Clinical data
- Other names: SR31742A; SR-31742; SR31742
- Routes of administration: Unknown
- Drug class: Sigma receptor modulator
- ATC code: None

Identifiers
- IUPAC name: 1-[(Z)-3-(3-chloro-4-cyclohexylphenyl)prop-2-enyl]azepane
- CAS Number: 139593-05-8 139592-99-7 (hydrochloride)
- PubChem CID: 9840549
- ChemSpider: 8016267
- UNII: 6NBE5XL6CN

Chemical and physical data
- Formula: C_{21}H_{30}ClN
- Molar mass: 331.93 g·mol^{−1}
- 3D model (JSmol): Interactive image
- SMILES: C1CCCN(CC1)C/C=C\C2=CC(=C(C=C2)C3CCCCC3)Cl
- InChI: InChI=1S/C21H30ClN/c22-21-17-18(9-8-16-23-14-6-1-2-7-15-23)12-13-20(21)19-10-4-3-5-11-19/h8-9,12-13,17,19H,1-7,10-11,14-16H2/b9-8-; Key:SSWKIOQXEOLZBE-HJWRWDBZSA-N

SR-31742A, or SR-31742, is a sigma receptor modulator which was under development for the treatment of schizophrenia and manic episodes but was never marketed. Its route of administration is unknown.

The drug is selective for the sigma receptors and shows high affinity for 3-PPP-labeled sigma receptors (K_{i} = 5.3 nM). Its selectivity for the sigma σ_{1} versus σ_{2} receptor is unknown, though it is known to have high affinity for the sigma σ_{1} receptor specifically. Whether SR-31742A is an agonist or antagonist of the sigma σ_{1} receptor is said to be unknown, though it has been described as an antagonist in some publications. The drug reduces the hyperlocomotion induced by dextroamphetamine and various other drugs without affecting spontaneous locomotor activity in rodents.

SR-31742A was under development by Sanofi-Synthelabo. It reached phase 2 clinical trials for both schizophrenia and manic episodes prior to the discontinuation of its development in 2001.

== See also ==
- List of investigational antipsychotics
- List of investigational bipolar disorder drugs
- Panamesine
