= BD1060 =

Chemical compound

Identifiers
- IUPAC name: N-[2-(3,4-dichlorophenyl)ethyl]-1-pyrrolidineethanamine
- CAS Number: 138356-10-2
- PubChem CID: 9882367
- ChemSpider: 8058042
- CompTox Dashboard (EPA): DTXSID901030388

Chemical and physical data
- Formula: C_{14}H_{20}Cl_{2}N_{2}
- Molar mass: 287.23 g·mol^{−1}
- 3D model (JSmol): Interactive image
- SMILES: C1CCN(C1)CCNCCC2=CC(=C(C=C2)Cl)Cl
- InChI: InChI=1S/C14H20Cl2N2/c15-13-4-3-12(11-14(13)16)5-6-17-7-10-18-8-1-2-9-18/h3-4,11,17H,1-2,5-10H2; Key:KFLJZQLENAVFAL-UHFFFAOYSA-N

BD1060 or N-[2-(3,4-dichlorophenyl)ethyl]-1-pyrrolidineethanamine is a selective sigma receptor antagonist, with a reported binding affinity of K_{i} = 3 ± 0.1 nM for the sigma-1 receptor and greater than 50 times selectivity over the sigma-2 receptor.

Like other sigma receptor antagonists, pretreating Swiss Webster mice with BD1060 significantly reduces the behavioral toxicity of cocaine.

== See also ==
- BD1008
- BD1031
- LR132
