= Opipramol =

Drug used to treat depressive and anxiety disorders

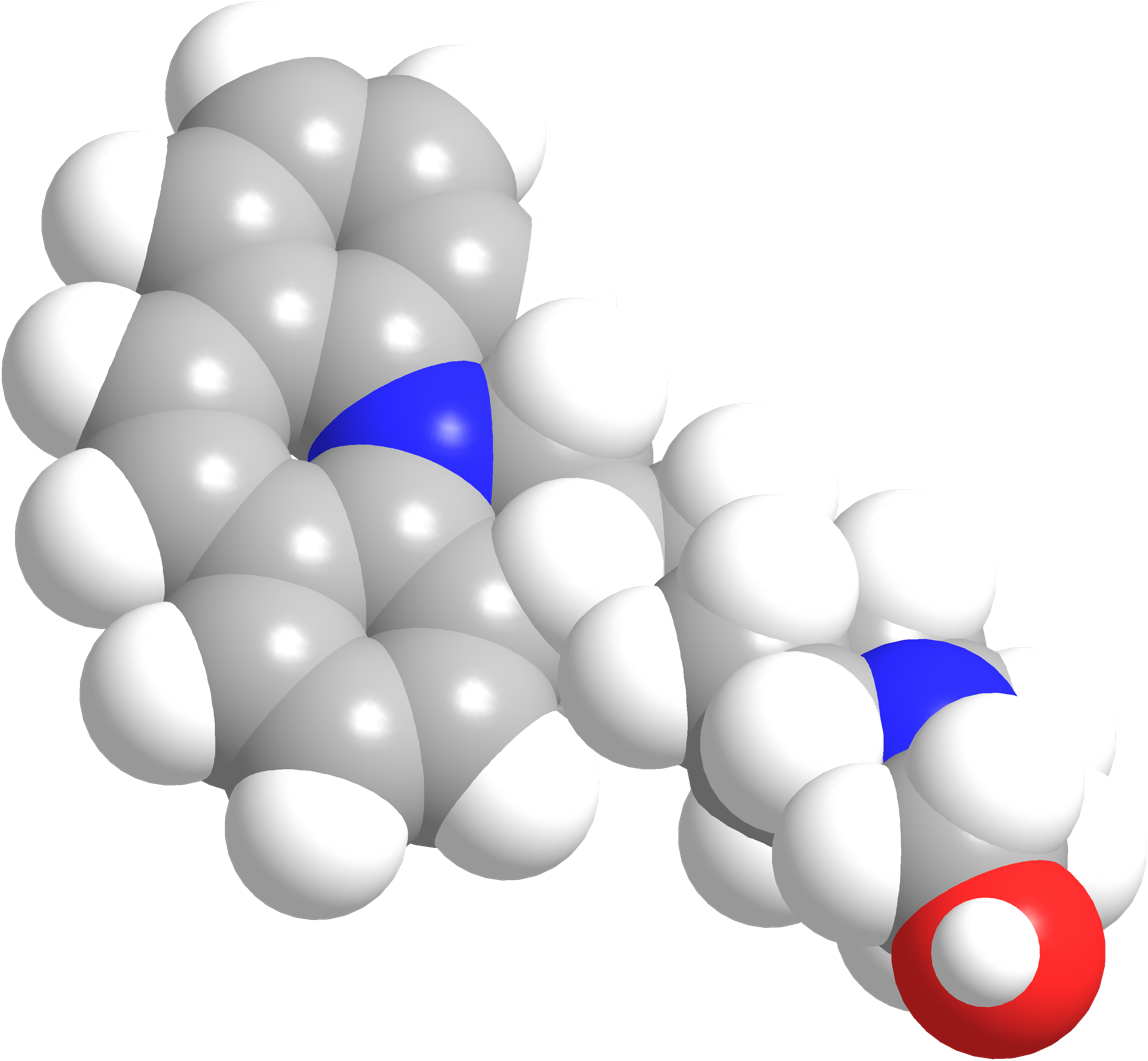

Clinical data
- Trade names: Insidon, Pramolan, others
- Other names: G-33040; RP-8307
- AHFS/Drugs.com: International Drug Names
- Routes of administration: By mouth
- Drug class: Tricyclic antidepressant; Anxiolytic; Sigma receptor agonist
- ATC code: N06AA05 (WHO)

Legal status
- Legal status: BR: Class C1 (Other controlled substances); In general: ℞ (Prescription only)

Pharmacokinetic data
- Bioavailability: 94%
- Protein binding: 91%
- Metabolism: CYP2D6-mediated
- Elimination half-life: 6–11 hours
- Excretion: Urine (70%), feces (10%)

Identifiers
- IUPAC name: 4-[3-(5H-dibenz[b,f]azepin- 5-yl)propyl]-1-piperazinethanol
- CAS Number: 315-72-0 909-39-7 (dihydrochloride)
- PubChem CID: 9417
- ChemSpider: 9046
- UNII: D23ZXO613C
- KEGG: D08297
- ChEMBL: ChEMBL370753
- CompTox Dashboard (EPA): DTXSID3023394
- ECHA InfoCard: 100.005.687

Chemical and physical data
- Formula: C_{23}H_{29}N_{3}O
- Molar mass: 363.505 g·mol^{−1}
- 3D model (JSmol): Interactive image
- SMILES: OCCN1CCN(CC1)CCCN4c2ccccc2\C=C/c3ccccc34
- InChI: InChI=1S/C23H29N3O/c27-19-18-25-16-14-24(15-17-25)12-5-13-26-22-8-3-1-6-20(22)10-11-21-7-2-4-9-23(21)26/h1-4,6-11,27H,5,12-19H2; Key:YNZFUWZUGRBMHL-UHFFFAOYSA-N

Opipramol, sold under the brand name Insidon among others, is an anxiolytic and tricyclic antidepressant that is used throughout Europe. Despite chemically being a tricyclic dibenzazepine (iminostilbene) derivative similar to imipramine, opipramol is not a monoamine reuptake inhibitor like most other tricyclic antidepressants, and instead acts primarily as a sigma-1 receptor agonist. It was developed by Schindler and Blattner in 1961.

== Medical uses ==
Opipramol is typically used in the treatment of generalized anxiety disorder (GAD) and somatoform disorders. Preliminary studies suggest that opipramol shows potential clinical significance in the treatment of severe sleep bruxism.

== Contraindications ==
Contraindications of opipramol include:

- In patients with hypersensitivity to opipramol or another component of the formulation
- Acute alcohol, sedative, analgesic, and antidepressant intoxications
- Acute urinary retention
- Acute delirium
- Untreated narrow-angle glaucoma
- Benign prostatic hyperplasia with residual urinary retention
- Paralytic ileus
- Pre-existing higher-grade atrioventricular blockages or diffuse supraventricular or ventricular stimulus conduction disturbances
- Combination with monoamine oxidase inhibitor (MAOI)

=== Pregnancy and lactation ===
Experimental animal studies did not indicate injurious effects of opipramol on the embryonic development or fertility. Opipramol should only be prescribed during pregnancy, particularly in the first trimester, for compelling indication. It should not be used during lactation and breastfeeding, since it passes into breast milk in small quantities.

== Side effects ==
Frequently (≥1% to <10%) reported adverse reactions with opipramol, especially at the beginning of the treatment, include fatigue, dry mouth, blocked nose, hypotension, and orthostatic dysregulation.

Adverse reactions reported occasionally (≥0.1% to <1%) include dizziness, stupor, micturition disturbances, vigilance, accommodation disturbances, tremor, weight gain, thirst, allergic skin reactions (rash, urticaria), abnormal ejaculation, erectile impotence, constipation, transient increases in liver enzymes, tachycardia, and palpitations.

Rarely (≥0.01% to <0.1%) reported adverse reactions include excitation, headache, paresthesia especially in elderly patients, restlessness, sweating, sleep disturbances, edema, galactorrhea, urine blockage, nausea and vomiting, fever, collapse conditions, stimulation conducting disturbances, intensification of present heart insufficiency, blood profile changes particularly leukopenia, confusion, delirium, stomach complaints, taste disturbance, and paralytic ileus especially with sudden discontinuation of a longer-term high-dose therapy.

Very rarely (<0.01%) reported adverse reactions include seizures, motor disorders (akathisia, dyskinesia, ataxia), polyneuropathy, glaucoma, anxiety, hair loss, agranulocytosis, severe liver dysfunction after long-term treatment, jaundice, and chronic liver damage.

== Overdose ==
Symptoms of intoxication from overdose include drowsiness, insomnia, stupor, agitation, coma, transient confusion, increased anxiety, ataxia, convulsions, oliguria, anuria, tachycardia or bradycardia, arrhythmia, AV block, hypotension, shock, respiratory depression, and, rarely, cardiac arrest.

== Interactions ==
While opipramol is not a monoamine reuptake inhibitor, any irreversible MAOIs should still be discontinued at least 14 days before treatment. Opipramol can compete with other tricyclic antidepressants, beta blockers, antiarrhythmics (of class 1c), and other drugs for microsomal enzymes, which can lead to slower metabolism and higher plasma concentrations of these drugs. Co-administration of antipsychotics (e.g., haloperidol, risperidone) can increase the plasma concentration of opipramol. Barbiturates and anticonvulsants can reduce the plasma concentration of opipramol and thereby weaken its therapeutic effect.

== Pharmacology ==
=== Pharmacodynamics ===
Opipramol
Site	K_{i} (nM)	Species	Ref
σ_{1}	0.2–50	Rodent	
σ_{2}	110	ND	
SERT	≥2,200	Rat/?	
NET	≥700	Rat/?	
DAT	≥3,000	Rat/?	
5-HT_{1A}	>10,000	?	
5-HT_{2A}	120	?	
5-HT_{2C}	ND	ND	ND
α_{1}	200	?	
α_{2}	6,100	?	
D_{1}	900	Rat	
D_{2}	120–300	Rat	
H_{1}	6.03	Human	
H_{2}	4,470	Human	
H_{3}	61,700	Human	
H_{4}	>100,000	Human	
mACh	3,300	?	
NMDA/PCP	>30,000	Rat	
Values are K_{i} (nM). The smaller the value, the more strongly the drug binds to the site.

Opipramol acts as a high affinity sigma receptor agonist, primarily of the σ_{1} subtype, but also of the σ_{2} subtype with lower affinity. In one study of σ_{1} receptor ligands that also included haloperidol, pentazocine, (+)-3-PPP, ditolylguanidine, dextromethorphan, SKF-10,047 ((±)-alazocine), ifenprodil, progesterone, and others, opipramol showed the highest affinity (K_{i} = 0.2–0.3) for the guinea pig σ_{1} receptor of all the tested ligands except haloperidol, which it was approximately equipotent with. The sigma receptor agonism of opipramol is thought to be responsible for its therapeutic benefits against anxiety and depression.

Unlike other TCAs, opipramol does not inhibit the reuptake of serotonin or norepinephrine. However, it does act as a high affinity antagonist of the histamine H_{1} receptor and is a low to moderate affinity antagonist of the dopamine D_{2}, serotonin 5-HT_{2}, and α_{1}-adrenergic receptors. H_{1} receptor antagonism accounts for its antihistamine effects and associated sedative side effects. In contrast to other TCAs, opipramol has very low affinity for the muscarinic acetylcholine receptors and virtually no anticholinergic effects.

Sigma receptors are a set of proteins located in the endoplasmic reticulum. σ_{1} receptors play key role in potentiating intracellular calcium mobilization thereby acting as sensor or modulator of calcium signaling. Occupancy of σ_{1} receptors by agonists causes translocation of the receptor from endoplasmic reticulum to peripheral areas (membranes) where the σ_{1} receptors cause neurotransmitter release. Opipramol is said to have a biphasic action, with prompt initial improvement of tension, anxiety, and insomnia followed by improved mood later. Hence, it is an anxiolytic with an antidepressant component. After sub-chronic treatment with opipramol, σ_{2} receptors are significantly downregulated but σ_{1} receptors are not.

=== Pharmacokinetics ===
Opipramol is rapidly and completely absorbed by the gastrointestinal tract. The bioavailability of opipramol amounts to 94%. After single oral administration of 50 mg, the peak plasma concentration of the drug is reached after 3.3 hours and amounts to 15.6 ng/mL. After single oral administration of 100 mg the maximum plasma concentration is reached after 3 hours and amounts to 33.2 ng/mL. Therapeutic concentrations of opipramol range from 140 to 550 nmol/L. The plasma protein binding amounts to approximately 91% and the volume of distribution is approximately 10 L/kg. Opipramol is partially metabolized in the liver to deshydroxyethylopipramol. Metabolism occurs through the CYP2D6 isoenzyme. Its terminal half-life in plasma is 6–11 hours. About 70% is eliminated in urine with 10% unaltered. The remaining portion is eliminated through feces.

== History ==
Opipramol was developed by Geigy. It first appeared in the literature in 1952 and was patented in 1961. The drug was first introduced for use in medicine in 1961. Opipramol was one of the first TCAs to be introduced, with imipramine marketed in the 1950s and amitriptyline marketed in 1961.

== Society and culture ==
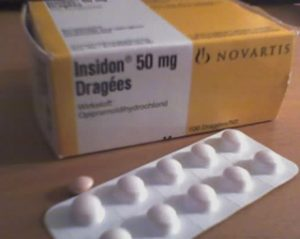
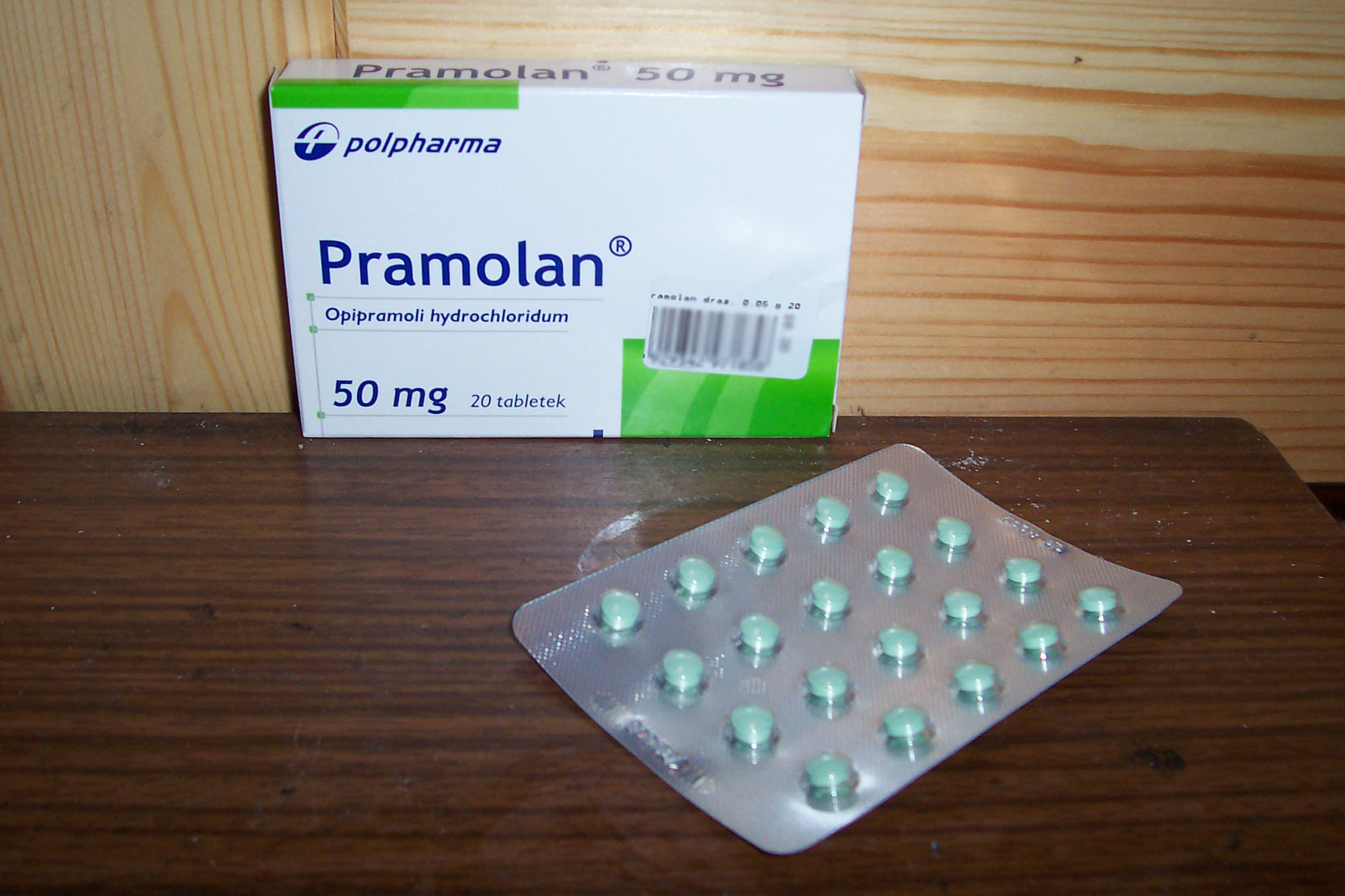
Opipramol as Insidon and Pramolan 50 mg tablets.

=== Generic names ===
Opipramol is the English, German, French, and Spanish generic name of the drug and its INN, BAN, and DCF, while opipramol hydrochloride is its USAN, BANM, and JAN. Its generic name in Italian and its DCIT is opipramolo and in Latin is opipramolum.

=== Brand names ===
Opipramol is marketed under the brand names Deprenil, Dinsidon, Ensidon, Insidon, Insomin, Inzeton, Nisidana, Opipram, Opramol, Oprimol, Pramolan, and Sympramol among others.
