= C23H33NO2 =

The molecular formula C_{23}H_{33}NO_{2} may refer to:

- Azastene, a steroidogenesis inhibitor
- Cyanoketone, a synthetic androstane steroid and a steroidogenesis inhibitor
- NE-100, a selective sigma-1 receptor antagonist
- Xipranolol, a beta blocker
