= C19H23NO =

The molecular formula C_{19}H_{23}NO (molar mass: 281.39 g/mol, exact mass: 281.1780 u) may refer to:

- Alimadol
- ANAVEX 1-41
- Blarcamesine (ANAVEX2-73)
- Cinnamedrine
- Diphenylpyraline
- Naphyrone
- SCH-5472
- Propallorphan
