= C18H22N2O =

The molecular formula C_{18}H_{22}N_{2}O (molar mass: 282.38 g/mol, exact mass: 282.1732 u) may refer to:

- B777-81
- PD 144418
- SF-6847
