= BD1018 =

Chemical compound

Identifiers
- IUPAC name: (S)-2-[2-(3,4-Dichlorophenyl)ethyl]octahydropyrrolo[1,2-a]pyrazine
- CAS Number: 150208-42-7
- PubChem CID: 9796317
- ChemSpider: 7972083
- UNII: G9DYE9JU44
- CompTox Dashboard (EPA): DTXSID80430866

Chemical and physical data
- Formula: C_{15}H_{20}Cl_{2}N_{2}
- Molar mass: 299.24 g·mol^{−1}
- 3D model (JSmol): Interactive image
- SMILES: Clc1ccc(cc1Cl)CCN3C[C@H]2N(CCC2)CC3
- InChI: InChI=1S/C15H20Cl2N2/c16-14-4-3-12(10-15(14)17)5-7-18-8-9-19-6-1-2-13(19)11-18/h3-4,10,13H,1-2,5-9,11H2/t13-/m0/s1; Key:IGVDQXLOMXGWKN-ZDUSSCGKSA-N

BD1018 or (S)-2-[2-(3,4-dichlorophenyl)ethyl]octahydropyrrolo[1,2-a]pyrazine is a selective sigma receptor ligand, with a reported binding affinity of K_{i} = 5 ± 0.7 nM for the sigma-1 receptor and approximately 10 times selectivity over the sigma-2 receptor. Unlike its enantiomer, BD1031, BD1018 acts as a sigma receptor antagonist.

Consistent with other reported sigma receptor antagonists, BD1018 decreases the behavioural toxicity of cocaine in Swiss Webster mice.

== See also ==
- BD1008
- BD1031
