= C15H20Cl2N2 =

The molecular formula C_{15}H_{20}Cl_{2}N_{2} (molar mass: 299.24 g/mol) may refer to:

- BD1018, a selective sigma receptor ligand
- BD1031, a selective sigma receptor agonist
