= ANAVEX 3-71 =

Clinical data
- Other names: ANAVEX3-71; AF710B; AF-710B
- Routes of administration: Oral
- Drug class: Muscarinic acetylcholine M_{1} receptor positive allosteric modulator; Sigma σ_{1} receptor agonist

Pharmacokinetic data
- Elimination half-life: 3.56 hours M8 metabolite: 6.59 hours

Identifiers
- IUPAC name: 1-(2,8-dimethyl-1-thia-3,8-diazaspiro[4.5]decan-3-yl)-3-(1H-indol-3-yl)propan-1-one
- CAS Number: 1235733-73-9
- PubChem CID: 58516166
- DrugBank: DB16911
- ChemSpider: 58828322
- UNII: AAE07Z061B

Chemical and physical data
- Formula: C_{20}H_{27}N_{3}OS
- Molar mass: 357.52 g·mol^{−1}
- 3D model (JSmol): Interactive image
- SMILES: CC1N(CC2(S1)CCN(CC2)C)C(=O)CCC3=CNC4=CC=CC=C43
- InChI: InChI=1S/C20H27N3OS/c1-15-23(14-20(25-15)9-11-22(2)12-10-20)19(24)8-7-16-13-21-18-6-4-3-5-17(16)18/h3-6,13,15,21H,7-12,14H2,1-2H3; Key:XWMHYQATSBWUNT-UHFFFAOYSA-N

ANAVEX 3-71, also known as AF710B, is a muscarinic acetylcholine M_{1} receptor positive allosteric modulator and sigma σ_{1} receptor agonist which is under development for the treatment of schizophrenia, Alzheimer's disease, frontotemporal dementia, other neurodegenerative disorders, and Parkinson's disease. It is taken orally. The drug shows pro-cognitive-like, neuroprotective, and neurorestorative effects in preclinical research. The pharmacokinetics of ANAVEX 3-71 have been studied in humans. ANAVEX 3-71 is under development by Anavex Life Sciences. As of October 2025, it is in phase 2 clinical trials for schizophrenia and phase 1 trials for Alzheimer's disease, frontotemporal dementia, and other neurodegenerative disorders, whereas no recent development has been reported for Parkinson's disease.

== See also ==
- List of investigational antipsychotics
- List of investigational Parkinson's disease drugs
- ANAVEX 1-41
- Blarcamesine (ANAVEX 2-73)
