= C21H27N =

The molecular formula C_{21}H_{27}N (molar mass: 293.44 g/mol, exact mass: 293.2143 u) may refer to:

- Budipine
- Butriptyline
- 4-PPBP, or 4-Phenyl-1-(4-phenylbutyl)piperidine
