= ANAVEX 1-41 =

Clinical data
- Other names: ANAVEX1-41; Anavex 1-41
- Drug class: Sigma σ_{1} receptor agonist; Muscarinic acetylcholine receptor modulator; Sodium channel modulator; Chloride channel modulator
- ATC code: None

Identifiers
- IUPAC name: 1-(5,5-diphenyloxolan-3-yl)-N,N-dimethylmethanamine
- CAS Number: 99761-13-4
- PubChem CID: 10446473

Chemical and physical data
- Formula: C_{19}H_{23}NO
- Molar mass: 281.399 g·mol^{−1}
- 3D model (JSmol): Interactive image
- SMILES: CN(C)CC1CC(OC1)(C2=CC=CC=C2)C3=CC=CC=C3
- InChI: InChI=1S/C19H23NO/c1-20(2)14-16-13-19(21-15-16,17-9-5-3-6-10-17)18-11-7-4-8-12-18/h3-12,16H,13-15H2,1-2H3; Key:AMVCMSPVJGQNFF-UHFFFAOYSA-N

ANAVEX 1-41, or ANAVEX1-41, is an experimental drug which is or was under development for the treatment of depressive disorders, neurodegenerative disorders, and stroke. It is a sigma σ_{1} receptor agonist (K_{i} = 44 nM), non-selective muscarinic acetylcholine receptor modulator (K_{i} = 18–114 nM), and sodium and chloride channel modulator. The drug is a positional isomer of blarcamesine (ANAVEX 2-73) and has similar actions. It was under development by Anavex Life Sciences. ANAVEX 1-41 reached the preclinical research stage of development prior to no recent development being reported as of 2022. It was intended as a backup compound for blarcamesine. The drug was first described in the scientific literature by 2007.

== See also ==
- List of investigational antidepressants
- Blarcamesine (ANAVEX 2-73)
- ANAVEX 3-71 (AF710B)
