= MS-377 =

Sigma-1 receptor antagonist

Names
- IUPAC name (3R)-1-(4-Chlorophenyl)-3-[[4-(2-methoxyethyl)piperazin-1-yl]methyl]pyrrolidin-2-one

Identifiers
CAS Number	206862-30-8 (free base); 206862-48-8 (_{L}-tartrate)
3D model (JSmol)	Interactive image
ChemSpider	4095365
PubChem CID	9892249
UNII	AM63U262BK
- InChI: InChI=1S/C18H26ClN3O2/c1-24-13-12-20-8-10-21(11-9-20)14-15-6-7-22(18(15)23)17-4-2-16(19)3-5-17/h2-5,15H,6-14H2,1H3/t15-/m1/s1 Key: DKVVPXLIRYCKCS-OAHLLOKOSA-N
- SMILES: COCCN1CCN(CC1)C[C@H]2CCN(C2=O)C3=CC=C(C=C3)Cl

Properties
Chemical formula	C_{18}H_{26}ClN_{3}O_{2}
Molar mass	351.88 g·mol^{−1}
- Except where otherwise noted, data are given for materials in their standard state (at 25 °C [77 °F], 100 kPa). Infobox references

MS-377 is a selective antagonist of the sigma-1 receptor. It possesses anti-psychotic properties.

== Properties ==
MS-377 acts selectively at the sigma-1 receptor as an antagonist. It does not act on dopamine or serotonin receptors unlike most anti-psychotics. Tests have shown that MS-377 could displace ligand binding from the sigma-1 receptor, but did this not happen at the sigma-2, 5-HT_{2} and D_{2} receptors, suggesting that it is selective for the sigma-1 receptor.

Despite not acting at serotonin and dopamine receptors, it still affects those monoamine systems. It has been shown that MS-377 reduced the release of serotonin and dopamine induced by PCP. It has also been shown to decrease methamphetamine behavioral sensitization, this is also observed with other sigma antagonists.
