= Panamesine =

Chemical compound

Clinical data
- Other names: EMD-57455

Pharmacokinetic data
- Metabolites: EMD-59983

Identifiers
- IUPAC name: (5S)-5-[[4-(1,3-Benzodioxol-5-yl)-4-hydroxypiperidin-1-yl]methyl]-3-(4-methoxyphenyl)-1,3-oxazolidin-2-one
- CAS Number: 139225-22-2
- PubChem CID: 3047810
- UNII: 023D9E916L
- ChEMBL: ChEMBL45686
- CompTox Dashboard (EPA): DTXSID00160971

Chemical and physical data
- Formula: C_{23}H_{26}N_{2}O_{6}
- Molar mass: 426.469 g·mol^{−1}
- 3D model (JSmol): Interactive image
- SMILES: COC1=CC=C(C=C1)N2C[C@@H](OC2=O)CN3CCC(CC3)(C4=CC5=C(C=C4)OCO5)O
- InChI: InChI=1S/C23H26N2O6/c1-28-18-5-3-17(4-6-18)25-14-19(31-22(25)26)13-24-10-8-23(27,9-11-24)16-2-7-20-21(12-16)30-15-29-20/h2-7,12,19,27H,8-11,13-15H2,1H3/t19-/m0/s1; Key:NINYZUDVKTUKIA-IBGZPJMESA-N

Panamesine (INN; developmental code name EMD-57455) is a sigma receptor antagonist that was under development by Merck as a potential antipsychotic for the treatment of schizophrenia in the 1990s but was never marketed. It is a selective antagonist of both sigma receptor subtypes, the σ_{1} and σ_{2} receptors (IC_{50} = 6 nM). In addition, the major metabolite of the drug, EMD-59983, has high affinity for the sigma receptors (IC_{50} = 24 nM) and the dopamine D_{2} (IC_{50} = 23 nM) and D_{3} receptors, with potent antidopaminergic activity. Panamesine reached phase II clinical trials for schizophrenia prior to the discontinuation of its development.

CNS review:

== See also ==
- List of investigational antipsychotics
- BMY-14802
- Eliprodil
- Rimcazole
