= BD-1047 =

Chemical compound

Clinical data
- ATC code: none

Identifiers
- IUPAC name: N'-[2-(3,4-dichlorophenyl)ethyl]-N,N,N'-trimethylethane-1,2-diamine
- CAS Number: 138356-20-4
- PubChem CID: 188914
- IUPHAR/BPS: 6680
- ChemSpider: 164154
- UNII: 1S3X75QGDO
- ChEMBL: ChEMBL143360
- CompTox Dashboard (EPA): DTXSID70160640

Chemical and physical data
- Formula: C_{13}H_{20}Cl_{2}N_{2}
- Molar mass: 275.22 g·mol^{−1}
- 3D model (JSmol): Interactive image
- SMILES: Clc1ccc(CCN(C)CCN(C)C)cc1Cl
- InChI: InChI=1S/C13H20Cl2N2/c1-16(2)8-9-17(3)7-6-11-4-5-12(14)13(15)10-11/h4-5,10H,6-9H2,1-3H3; Key:MGVRNMUKTZOQOW-UHFFFAOYSA-N

BD-1047 is a sigma receptor antagonist, selective for the σ_{1} subtype. It has effects in animal studies suggestive of antipsychotic activity and may also be useful in the treatment of neuropathic pain.

More recent studies also suggest a novel role for BD-1047 in attenuating ethanol-induced neurotoxicity in vitro, and additional research is being conducted on this compound as a possible pharmacotherapy for alcohol use disorder (AUD)
