= Mefeclorazine =

Neuroleptic

Identifiers
- IUPAC name: 1-(2-chlorophenyl)-4-[2-(3,4-dimethoxyphenyl)ethyl]piperazine
- CAS Number: 1243-33-0
- PubChem CID: 3064105
- ChemSpider: 2324598
- UNII: IM840F32VV
- ChEMBL: ChEMBL2107173
- CompTox Dashboard (EPA): DTXSID30154262

Chemical and physical data
- Formula: C_{20}H_{25}ClN_{2}O_{2}
- Molar mass: 360.88 g·mol^{−1}
- 3D model (JSmol): Interactive image
- SMILES: COC1=C(C=C(C=C1)CCN2CCN(CC2)C3=CC=CC=C3Cl)OC
- InChI: InChI=1S/C20H25ClN2O2/c1-24-19-8-7-16(15-20(19)25-2)9-10-22-11-13-23(14-12-22)18-6-4-3-5-17(18)21/h3-8,15H,9-14H2,1-2H3; Key:PJDRMPCBIWKBJA-UHFFFAOYSA-N

Mefeclorazine (INN) is a neuroleptic (antipsychotic) of the phenethylamine and arylpiperazine groups.

Part of mefeclorazine's chemical structure is based on 3,4-dimethoxyphenethylamine (DMPEA or homoveratrylamine), which has structural similarity to the neurotransmitter dopamine. Mefeclorazine was invented by Jack Mills of Eli Lilly in 1958. Although it is not known to have ever been used clinically, it is based on a chemically rational synthetic design.

The ortho-chlorophenylpiperazine (oCPP) moiety forms part of the molecular structure. This precursor finds dual use in the synthesis of the arylpiperazines enpiprazole and KMUP-1.

== See also ==
- Cutamesine

== See also ==
- Substituted piperazine
