= 1-Cyclohexylpiperazine =

Names
- Preferred IUPAC name 1-Cyclohexylpiperazine

Identifiers
CAS Number	17766-28-8
3D model (JSmol)	Interactive image; Interactive image
ChEMBL	ChEMBL574182
ChemSpider	78749
ECHA InfoCard	100.037.939
PubChem CID	87298
UNII	2U3UBJ45HD
CompTox Dashboard (EPA)	DTXSID40170357
- InChI: InChI=1S/C10H20N2/c1-2-4-10(5-3-1)12-8-6-11-7-9-12/h10-11H,1-9H2 Key: XPDSXKIDJNKIQY-UHFFFAOYSA-N; InChI=1/C10H20N2/c1-2-4-10(5-3-1)12-8-6-11-7-9-12/h10-11H,1-9H2 Key: XPDSXKIDJNKIQY-UHFFFAOYAK
- SMILES: C1CCC(CC1)N2CCNCC2; N2CCN(C1CCCCC1)CC2

Properties
Chemical formula	C_{10}H_{20}N_{2}
Molar mass	168.284 g·mol^{−1}
- Except where otherwise noted, data are given for materials in their standard state (at 25 °C [77 °F], 100 kPa). verify (what is ?) Infobox references

1-Cyclohexylpiperazine is a synthetic chemical compound derived from piperazine. As a substituted piperazine, 1-cyclohexylpiperazine serves as a precursor and intermediate for several experimental antineoplastics and substances, including PB-28 and phenoxyalkylpiperazine derivatives.

1-Cyclohexylpiperazine is also recognized as an eye and respiratory irritant, and is potentially corrosive to human skin.

In pharmacology, 1-cyclohexylpiperazine, unlike some derived piperazines, is not considered a drug. It is instead classified as a ligand with an affinity for sigma receptors (σ-receptors). In unsubstituted variants, 1-cyclohexylpiperazine has a weak affinity for sigma-1 and sigma-2 receptors (σ-receptors), though its derivatives have some form of nanomolar affinity.

== Characteristics ==
=== Properties and molecular structure ===
At standard temperature and pressure, 1-cyclohexylpiperazine is a solid powder with variable color ranging between white, yellow, and brown. 1-cyclohexylpiperazine has a molecular formula of C_{10}H_{20}N_{2} and a molar mass of 168.28 g/mol, or 168.162648646 Da.

1-Cyclohexylpiperazine is composed of a piperazine ring, a cyclohexyl group, and aliphatic nitrogen amines. As nitrogen possesses lone pairs of electrons, this leads to the compound's high molecular nucleophilicity and a potential to transfer electrons. As such, 1-cyclohexylpiperazine may react strongly with oxidizing agents during N-oxidation. Its nitrogen atoms may also exist in protonated forms, which supplement the formation of an ionic salt if counterions are present.

=== Physical properties ===
At 25 °C (77 °F) and 1 standard atmosphere (101.325 kPa) in air, 1-cyclohexylpiperazine possesses a density of 0.9725 g/cm^{3}. Furthermore, it retains a low melting point of 28 °C (88 °F) to 37 °C (99 °F), a flash point of 103.3 °C (217.94 °F) and a boiling point of 255.7 (492.26 °F) to 287.25 °C (549.05 °F), assuming 760 mmHg.

As 1-cyclohexylpiperazine is moderately hydrophobic, it is only slightly soluble in water. It is soluble in methanol and chloroform.

== Safety and precautions ==
=== Toxicity ===
1-Cyclohexylpiperazine is considered toxic to the human body, specifically the respiratory system. In vaporous forms, it is advised to use in a well-ventilated area, or outdoors. In solid forms, it is ill-advised for consumption.

== Applications ==
1-Cyclohexylpiperazine serves as a fundamental intermediate, e.g. neuropharmacological derivatives used for the treatment of cranial nerve disorders, or for the synthesis of active pharmaceutical ingredients like Avatrombopag. It may also serve as a negative control and reference standard for nuclear magnetic resonance spectroscopy.
