= C21H25N =

The molecular formula C_{21}H_{25}N (molar mass: 291.43 g/mol, exact mass: 291.1987 u) may refer to:

- L-687,384
- Terbinafine
- Melitracen
