= Alazocine =

Synthetic opioid analgesic

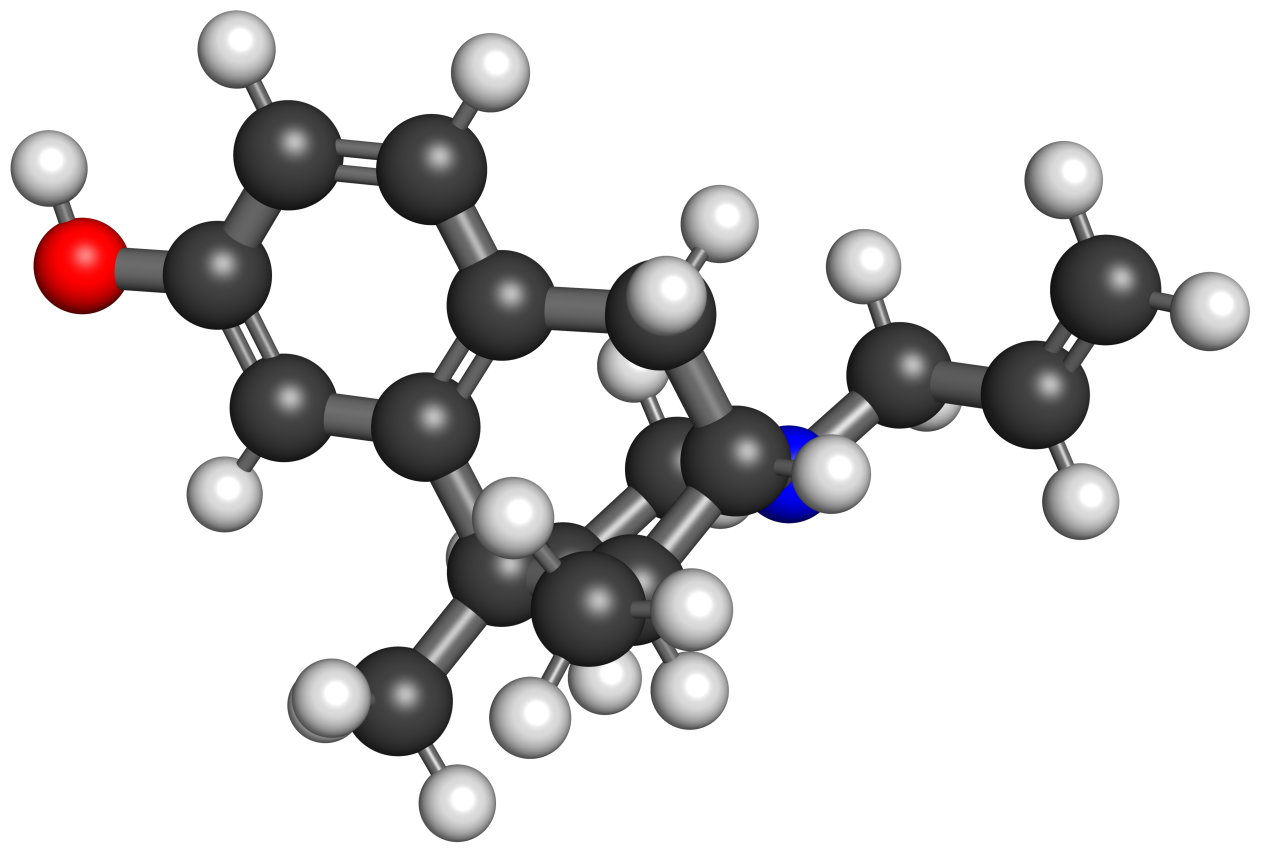

Clinical data
- Other names: SKF-10047; WIN-19631; N-Allylnormetazocine; NANM; NAN; ANMC; 2'-Hydroxy-5,9-dimethyl-2-allyl-6,7-benzomorphan
- ATC code: None

Identifiers
- IUPAC name: (±)-1,2,3,4,5,6-hexahydro-6,11-dimethyl-3-(2-propen-1-yl)-2,6-methano-3-benzazocin-8-ol
- CAS Number: 825594-24-9 34061-23-9 (hydrochloride) 14198-28-8 ((−)-isomer) 58640-82-7 ((+)-isomer) 74957-58-7 ((−)-isomer HCl) 133005-41-1 ((+)-isomer HCl)
- PubChem CID: 1235
- ChemSpider: 1198
- UNII: L884482HDD
- ChEMBL: ChEMBL274099
- CompTox Dashboard (EPA): DTXSID20931281
- ECHA InfoCard: 100.162.264

Chemical and physical data
- Formula: C_{17}H_{23}NO
- Molar mass: 257.377 g·mol^{−1}
- 3D model (JSmol): Interactive image
- SMILES: CC1C2CC3=C(C1(CCN2CC=C)C)C=C(C=C3)O
- InChI: InChI=1S/C17H23NO/c1-4-8-18-9-7-17(3)12(2)16(18)10-13-5-6-14(19)11-15(13)17/h4-6,11-12,16,19H,1,7-10H2,2-3H3; Key:LGQCVMYAEFTEFN-UHFFFAOYSA-N

Alazocine (developmental code name SKF-10047), also known more commonly as N-allylnormetazocine (NANM), is a synthetic opioid analgesic of the benzomorphan family related to metazocine, which was never marketed. In addition to its opioid activity, the drug is a sigma receptor agonist, and has been used widely in scientific research in studies of this receptor. Alazocine is described as a potent analgesic, psychotomimetic or hallucinogen, and opioid antagonist. Moreover, one of its enantiomers was the first compound that was found to selectively label the σ_{1} receptor, and led to the discovery and characterization of the receptor. Alazocine has been encountered as a novel designer drug.

== Pharmacology ==
=== Pharmacodynamics ===
Alazocine shows stereoselectivity in its pharmacodynamics. The (−)-enantiomer is a non-selective and high-affinity ligand of the μ-, κ-, and δ-opioid receptors (K_{i} = 3.0, 4.7, and 15 nM in guinea pig brain membranes) with very low affinity for the sigma σ_{1} receptor (K_{i} = 1,800–4,657 nM in guinea pig brain membranes). It acts as a moderate-efficacy partial agonist of the κ-opioid receptor (K_{i} = 0.4 nM, EC_{50} = 24 nM, and E_{max} = 66% for (±)-alazocine against the mouse receptor transfected in HEK293 cells) and as an antagonist of the μ-opioid receptor (K_{i} = 1.15 nM for (±)-alazocine against the mouse receptor transfected in HEK293 cells). It is also an agonist of the δ-opioid receptor with far lower potency (K_{i} = not reported, IC_{50} = 184 nM, and I_{max} = 68% for (±)-alazocine against the mouse receptor transfected in HEK293 cells).

Conversely, the (+)-stereoisomer has little affinity for the opioid receptors (K_{i} for 1,900 nM, 1,600 nM, and 19,000 nM for the μ-, κ-, δ-opioid receptors in guinea pig brain membranes) and instead is a selective and high-affinity agonist of the σ_{1} receptor (K_{i} = 48–66 nM in guinea pig brain membranes). However, the (+)-enantiomer also shows moderate affinity for the dizocilpine (MK-801) or phencyclidine (PCP) site of the NMDA receptor (K_{i} = 587 nM in rat brain membranes relative to 45 nM for the σ_{1} receptor) and, hence, is an uncompetitive NMDA receptor antagonist as well at higher concentrations. As such, (+)-alazocine is only modestly selective as a ligand of the σ_{1} receptor.

Both enantiomers of alazocine have very low affinity for the sigma σ_{2} receptor (K_{i} = 13,694 nM and 4,581 nM for the (+)- and (−)-enantiomers, respectively, in rat brain membranes or rat PC12 cells). As such, due to its high affinity for the σ_{1} receptor, (+)-alazocine can be used to distinguish between the two sigma receptor subtypes in scientific research, for instance in radioligand binding assays.

Taken together, (−)-alazocine is a selective partial agonist of the κ-opioid receptor, antagonist of the μ-opioid receptor, and to a far lesser extent agonist of the δ-opioid receptor with very low affinity for the sigma receptors, while (+)-alazocine is a selective agonist of the sigma σ_{1} receptor and to a lesser (~10-fold) extent antagonist of the NMDA receptor with low affinity for the opioid and sigma σ_{2} receptors.

== History ==
Alazocine was one of the early members of the benzomorphan family of opioid analgesics to be investigated. It was first described in the scientific literature in 1961. Its development resulted from nalorphine (N-allylnormorphine), a potent analgesic and opioid antagonist with similar pharmacology which had been introduced in the mid-1950s. Alazocine was found to produce strong psychotomimetic effects in humans, and it was not further developed for clinical use. Subsequently, other benzomorphans, such as pentazocine (an N-dimethylallylbenzomorphan), cyclazocine (an N-cyclopropylmethylbenzomorphan), and phenazocine (an N-phenylethylbenzomorphan), were developed, and some have been marketed for use as analgesics.

The sigma σ_{1} receptor was named in 1976 and (+)-alazocine was described as its prototypical ligand. The receptor was initially thought to be an opioid receptor, and then was confused with the NMDA receptor for a time, but was ultimately distinguished from them both. The psychotomimetic effects of alazocine and the other benzomorphans were initially attributed incorrectly to agonism of the σ_{1} receptor; subsequent research established that the effects are in fact caused by agonism of the κ-opioid receptor and/or antagonism of the NMDA receptor. The sigma σ_{2} receptor was discovered and named in 1990, and was identified in part due to the dramatically reduced affinity of alazocine for the receptor relative to the σ_{1} receptor (in contrast to non-selective ligands like haloperidol, ditolylguanidine, and (+)-3-PPP, which show similar affinity for both subtypes).

It was encountered as a novel designer drug by 2019.
