= Igmesine =

Chemical compound

Clinical data
- ATC code: none

Identifiers
- IUPAC name: (E)-N-(cyclopropylmethyl)-N-ethyl-3,6-diphenylhex-5-en-3-amine
- CAS Number: 140850-73-3
- PubChem CID: 6438340
- ChemSpider: 4942823
- UNII: XA3745J38K
- CompTox Dashboard (EPA): DTXSID801028764

Chemical and physical data
- Formula: C_{23}H_{29}N
- Molar mass: 319.492 g·mol^{−1}
- 3D model (JSmol): Interactive image
- SMILES: N(C(c1ccccc1)(CC)C\C=C\c2ccccc2)(C)CC3CC3
- InChI: InChI=1S/C23H29N/c1-3-23(22-14-8-5-9-15-22,24(2)19-21-16-17-21)18-10-13-20-11-6-4-7-12-20/h4-15,21H,3,16-19H2,1-2H3/b13-10+; Key:VCZSWYIFCKGTJI-JLHYYAGUSA-N

Igmesine (JO-1,784) is a sigma receptor agonist (IC_{50} = 39 nM (rat brain)). It has neuroprotective and antidepressant-like effects in animal studies, as well as nootropic effects in models of age-related cognitive decline. In two phase II clinical trials, igmesine was found to be effective in the treatment of depression and was as active as the comparator fluoxetine. However, in a large phase III clinical trial, igmesine failed to show significant effectiveness for depression. The drug has not been developed further.
