= CNS-5161 =

Clinical data
- Other names: CNS5161
- Routes of administration: Intravenous, transdermal
- Drug class: NMDA receptor antagonist; Dissociative; Hallucinogen
- ATC code: None

Pharmacokinetic data
- Elimination half-life: 2.95 hours

Identifiers
- IUPAC name: 2-(2-chloro-5-methylsulfanylphenyl)-1-methyl-1-(3-methylsulfanylphenyl)guanidine
- CAS Number: 160754-76-7
- PubChem CID: 192711
- DrugBank: DB05824
- ChemSpider: 167230
- UNII: 58S83M36V6
- ChEMBL: ChEMBL41306
- CompTox Dashboard (EPA): DTXSID20166975

Chemical and physical data
- Formula: C_{16}H_{18}ClN_{3}S_{2}
- Molar mass: 351.91 g·mol^{−1}
- 3D model (JSmol): Interactive image
- SMILES: CN(C1=CC(=CC=C1)SC)C(=NC2=C(C=CC(=C2)SC)Cl)N
- InChI: InChI=1S/C16H18ClN3S2/c1-20(11-5-4-6-12(9-11)21-2)16(18)19-15-10-13(22-3)7-8-14(15)17/h4-10H,1-3H3,(H2,18,19); Key:JHVHEDNLONERHY-UHFFFAOYSA-N

CNS-5161 is an NMDA receptor antagonist which was under development for the treatment of neuropathic pain and cancer pain but was never marketed. It is taken by intravenously or transdermally.

== Adverse effects ==
CNS-5161 was found to produce mild dissociative-like effects such as visual disturbances and derealization at assessed doses of 250 to 2,000 μg intravenously in clinical trials. In addition, it produced pronounced and dose-limiting hypertension.

== Pharmacology ==
=== Pharmacodynamics ===
CNS-5161 is a highly potent and selective noncompetitive antagonist of the NMDA receptor via the ion channel or dizocilpine (MK-801) binding site, with an affinity (K_{i}) of 1.8 nM. It produces analgesic, anticonvulsant, and neuroprotective effects in rodents. There was also some dose-dependent mortality related to respiratory failure in rodents.

== Chemistry ==
=== Synthesis ===
The chemical synthesis of CNS-5161 and isotopologues has been described.

== Development ==
CNS-5161 was under development by CeNeS Pharmaceuticals. It reached phase 2 trials prior to the discontinuation of its development.

== See also ==
- NMDA receptor antagonist
- Aptiganel (CNS-1102)
