= Cutamesine =

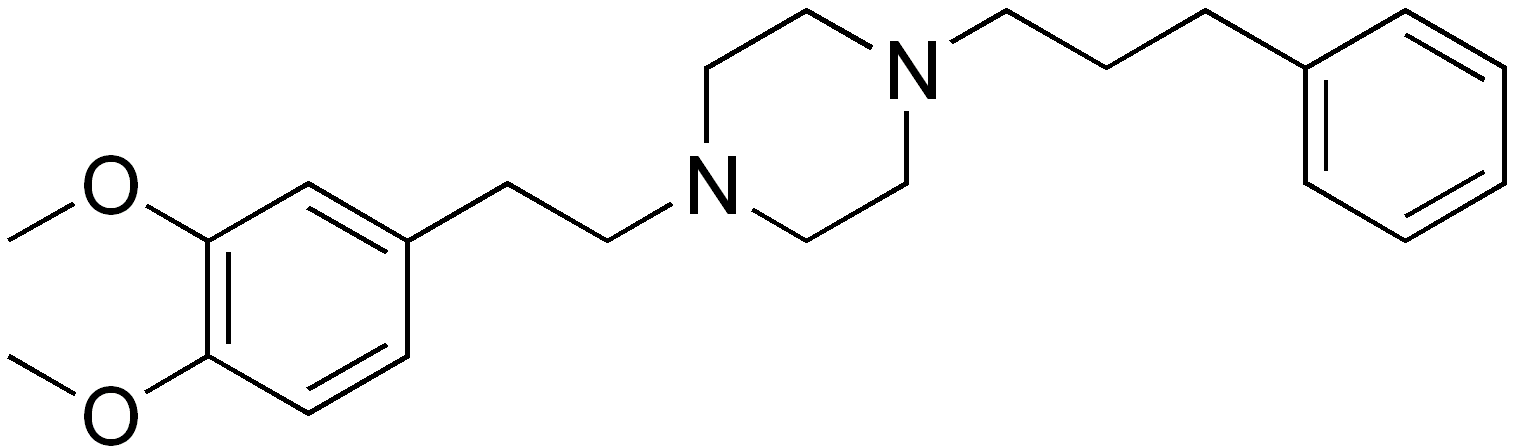

Names
- Preferred IUPAC name 1-[2-(3,4-Dimethoxyphenyl)ethyl]-4-(3-phenylpropyl)piperazine

Identifiers
CAS Number	165377-43-5; dihydrochloride: 165377-44-6
3D model (JSmol)	Interactive image; dihydrochloride: Interactive image
ChEMBL	ChEMBL408867; dihydrochloride: ChEMBL3216524
ChemSpider	8082975; dihydrochloride: 8130551
DrugBank	DB06618
PubChem CID	9907323; dihydrochloride: 9954941
UNII	9J7A4144BX; dihydrochloride: B66RO93FXQ
CompTox Dashboard (EPA)	DTXSID50167935
- InChI: InChI=1S/C23H32N2O2/c1-26-22-11-10-21(19-23(22)27-2)12-14-25-17-15-24(16-18-25)13-6-9-20-7-4-3-5-8-20/h3-5,7-8,10-11,19H,6,9,12-18H2,1-2H3 Key: UVSWWUWQVAQPJR-UHFFFAOYSA-N; dihydrochloride: InChI=1S/C23H32N2O2.2ClH/c1-26-22-11-10-21(19-23(22)27-2)12-14-25-17-15-24(16-18-25)13-6-9-20-7-4-3-5-8-20;;/h3-5,7-8,10-11,19H,6,9,12-18H2,1-2H3;2*1H Key: XWOXAKBQEMQMFH-UHFFFAOYSA-N
- SMILES: COC1=C(OC)C=C(CCN2CCN(CCCC3=CC=CC=C3)CC2)C=C1; dihydrochloride: COC1=C(C=C(C=C1)CCN2CCN(CC2)CCCC3=CC=CC=C3)OC.Cl.Cl

Properties
Chemical formula	C_{23}H_{32}N_{2}O_{2}
Molar mass	368.521 g·mol^{−1}
- Except where otherwise noted, data are given for materials in their standard state (at 25 °C [77 °F], 100 kPa). verify (what is ?) Infobox references

Cutamesine (SA 4503) is a synthetic sigma receptor agonist which is selective for the σ_{1} receptor, a chaperone protein mainly found in the endoplasmic reticulum of cells in the central nervous system. These σ_{1} receptors play a key role in the modulation of Ca^{2+} release and apoptosis. Cutamesine's activation of the σ_{1} receptor is tied to a variety of physiological phenomena in the CNS, including activation of dopamine-releasing neurons and repression of the MAPK/ERK pathway.

== Structure ==
The molecular formula for cutamesine is C_{23}H_{32}N_{2}O_{2}. This particular agonist is a piperazine, meaning that its core functional group is a six-membered heterocycle with two oppositely-placed nitrogen atoms. Two phenalkyl groups act as substituents for the two nitrogen atoms. The phenethyl group has methoxy groups on the 3 and 4 locations of the aromatic ring, while the phenpropyl group has no additional functional groups attached.

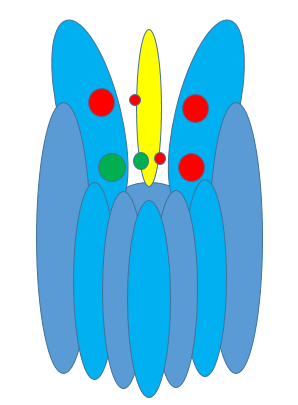
Cutamesine (yellow) exhibits preferential binding to the sigma-1 receptor (blue). The piperazine ring interacts with the amine binding site (green), and the phenalkyl groups interact with two of the three hydrophobic pockets (red).

== Affinity ==
=== Causes of Affinity ===
The 3,4-methoxy groups located on the phenethyl group play an important role in σ receptor binding affinity, with alterations made to these groups leading to changes in affinity to σ_{1}. Replacement side groups that possess the most steric bulk have the lowest binding affinity for the σ_{1} receptor. The nitrogen atoms in the molecule play a central role in its affinity, as removal of these nitrogen atoms results in a lack of affinity to σ_{1}. N(b) - the nitrogen in the piperazine attached to the longest substituent - plays a much greater role in binding affinity than N(a). Sigma receptors are defined by the presence of one amine binding site and three hydrophobic binding sites nearby in the ligand-binding region. Thus, the N(b) atom in the central piperazine ring serves to interact with the amine binding site and the two phenethyl groups serve to fill two out of the three hydrophobic pockets.

=== Binding Trends ===
Cutamesine exhibits high binding affinity for the σ_{1} receptor, with greatly reduced affinity for the σ_{2} receptor. It acts as a competitive inhibitor for (+)-[3H]pentazocine. Haloperidol and NE-100 antagonize cutamesine-induced cholinergic (acetylcholine) facilitation. Cutamesine likely does not interact directly with cholinergic receptors, as its binding affinity for them is nearly non-existent. It can also bind to vertebral emopamil binding protein (EBP). Although EBP exists at a lower density in the brain than σ_{1} receptors, cutamesine exhibits higher affinity for the former.

== Physiological Effects ==
=== Memory and Amnesia ===
It has been shown that cutamesine has anti-amnesic properties and could be used to reduce the effects of amnesia caused by REM sleep deprivation. Decreases in the memory function of rats caused by the presence of scopolamine has been shown to be mitigated by the introduction of SA 4503. The activation of the MAPK/ERK (mitogen-activated protein kinase/extracellular signal-regulated kinase) pathway in neurons is repressed by SA 4503, which in turn leads to reduced stress-related cell death. The presence of SA 4503 has a positive impact on the number of active dopaminergic neurons in the frontal cortex, which is linked to improved memory function.

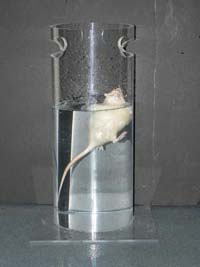
Rodents that were administered cutamesine had a lower immobility time than the control.

=== Depression ===
σ_{1} receptors are of interest to scientists studying the neurology of depression, as certain antidepressants (ADs) exhibit high affinity for these receptors and σ_{1} receptor agonists such as SA 4503 have displayed activity similar to that of ADs in non-human trials. The function of dopaminergic systems has been linked to the effectiveness of ADs, and many experiments involving cutamesine have revolved around dopamine. The presence of SA 4503 has been linked to increases in the concentration of dopamine and dihydroxyphenylacetic acid (a metabolite of dopamine) in the frontal cortex. Cutamesine may assist with the release of dopamine from presynaptic neurons in the frontal cortex. For rodents, there was a negative correlation between SA 4503 levels and immobility time during a forced swimming test.

=== Heart ===
The administration of cutamesine has been shown to mitigate the effects of cardiac hypertrophy. Angiotensin II-induced hypertrophy results in lower ATP production and smaller mitochondrial size in cardiomyocytes, and introduction of SA 4503 returns both ATP production and mitochondrial size to baseline.

=== Hearing ===
The presence of cutamesine is positively correlated with the presence of hippocampal brain‐derived neurotrophic factor (BDNF). Due to the relationship between the presence of BDNF and ciliary neurotrophic factor and the preservation of auditory nerves, it is thought that cutamesine may have a positive effect on the health of the cochlea. Despite the apparent auditory benefits of cutamesine treatment, it does not prevent hearing loss that is a result of aging.

== See also ==
- Mefeclorazine
- Vanoxerine (shares same phenylpropyl group attached to piperazine)
