= Aptiganel =

Chemical compound

Clinical data
- ATC code: none

Legal status
- Legal status: In general: uncontrolled

Identifiers
- IUPAC name: 1-(3-ethylphenyl)-1-methyl-2-naphthalen-1-yl-guanidine
- CAS Number: 137159-92-3
- PubChem CID: 60840
- ChemSpider: 54827
- UNII: 46475LV84I
- ChEMBL: ChEMBL92484
- CompTox Dashboard (EPA): DTXSID4048432

Chemical and physical data
- Formula: C_{20}H_{21}N_{3}
- Molar mass: 303.409 g·mol^{−1}
- 3D model (JSmol): Interactive image
- SMILES: CCC1=CC(=CC=C1)N(C)C(=NC2=CC=CC3=CC=CC=C32)N
- InChI: InChI=1S/C20H21N3/c1-3-15-8-6-11-17(14-15)23(2)20(21)22-19-13-7-10-16-9-4-5-12-18(16)19/h4-14H,3H2,1-2H3,(H2,21,22); Key:BFNCJMURTMZBTE-UHFFFAOYSA-N

Aptiganel (Cerestat; CNS-1102) is an unsuccessful drug candidate which acts as a noncompetitive NMDA antagonist, and that was under development by Cambridge Neuroscience, Inc as a treatment for stroke due to its neuroprotective effects. However, despite positive results in animal studies, human trials showed limited efficacy and undesirable side effects such as sedation and hallucinations, leading to the discontinuation of clinical development.

== Chemistry ==
=== Synthesis ===
Aptiganel synthesis:

1-Naphthylamine is reacted with cyanogen bromide to give 2. Treatment of this intermediate with 3-ethyl-N-methylaniline leads to addition to the cyano group and formation of the corresponding diaryl guanidine, aptiganel, 3.

== History ==
The drug's failure led to the collapse of Cambridge Neuroscience in 1998 and its eventual sale to CeNeS Pharmaceuticals in 2000.

== See also ==
- Ditolylguanidine
- CNS-1237 (shares most of the same structural entities)
- CNS-5161
