= Rimcazole =

Chemical compound

Clinical data
- ATC code: none

Identifiers
- IUPAC name: 9-{3-[(3R,5S)-3,5-Dimethylpiperazin-1-yl]propyl}-9H-carbazole
- CAS Number: 75859-04-0
- PubChem CID: 53389
- ChemSpider: 48221
- UNII: C3N1PS8CX1
- ChEMBL: ChEMBL275707
- CompTox Dashboard (EPA): DTXSID7048162

Chemical and physical data
- Formula: C_{21}H_{27}N_{3}
- Molar mass: 321.468 g·mol^{−1}
- 3D model (JSmol): Interactive image
- SMILES: C[C@@H]1CN(C[C@@H](N1)C)CCCN2C3=CC=CC=C3C4=CC=CC=C42
- InChI: InChI=1S/C21H27N3/c1-16-14-23(15-17(2)22-16)12-7-13-24-20-10-5-3-8-18(20)19-9-4-6-11-21(19)24/h3-6,8-11,16-17,22H,7,12-15H2,1-2H3/t16-,17+; Key:GUDVQJXODNJRIJ-CALCHBBNSA-N

Rimcazole is an antagonist of the sigma receptor as well as a dopamine reuptake inhibitor. Sigma receptors are thought to be involved in the drug psychosis that can be induced by some drugs such as phencyclidine and cocaine, and rimcazole was originally researched as a potential antipsychotic with a different mechanism of action to traditional antipsychotic drugs, although common with butyrophenone antipsychotics such as haloperidol. Trials proved inconclusive and rimcazole was not pursued for this application, but other sigma antagonists continue to be researched for a variety of potential applications. Rimcazole has been shown to reduce the effects of cocaine, and analogues of rimcazole have been shown to be highly effective at blocking the convulsions caused by cocaine overdose in animal models. Isothiocyanate derivatives of rimcazole acting as irreversible dopamine transporter (DAT) blockers have been developed.

== See also ==
- Amineptine
