= PB-28 =

- PB28

Names
- IUPAC name 1-cyclohexyl-4-[3-(5-methoxy-1,2,3,4-tetra- hydronaphthalen-1-yl)propyl]piperazine
- Other names PB28

Identifiers
CAS Number	dihydrochloride: 172906-90-0
3D model (JSmol)	Interactive image
ChEBI	CHEBI:189648
ChEMBL	ChEMBL53325
ChemSpider	8649746
ECHA InfoCard	100.215.826
IUPHAR/BPS	6681
MeSH	C097775
PubChem CID	10474335; dihydrochloride: 46861545
UNII	XTX7Z22467
CompTox Dashboard (EPA)	DTXSID00676880
- InChI: InChI=1S/C24H38N2O/c1-27-24-14-6-12-22-20(8-5-13-23(22)24)9-7-15-25-16-18-26(19-17-25)21-10-3-2-4-11-21/h6,12,14,20-21H,2-5,7-11,13,15-19H2,1H3 Key: PHRCDWVPTULQMT-UHFFFAOYSA-N; InChI=1/C24H38N2O/c1-27-24-14-6-12-22-20(8-5-13-23(22)24)9-7-15-25-16-18-26(19-17-25)21-10-3-2-4-11-21/h6,12,14,20-21H,2-5,7-11,13,15-19H2,1H3 Key: PHRCDWVPTULQMT-UHFFFAOYAW
- SMILES: COc1c(CCCC2CCCN3CCN(C4CCCCC4)CC3)c2ccc1

Properties
Chemical formula	C_{24}H_{38}N_{2}O
Molar mass	370.57 g/mol
- Except where otherwise noted, data are given for materials in their standard state (at 25 °C [77 °F], 100 kPa). verify (what is ?) Infobox references

PB-28 is an agonist of the sigma-2 receptor.

It is derived from cyclohexylpiperazine.

== Usage ==
=== Research and oncology ===
In oncology, it has been noted that PB-28 reverts doxorubicin resistance of breast cancer cells by supplementing Oxygen (O_{2}) receptor binding.
