= 3-PPP =

Chemical compound

Clinical data
- Other names: Preclamol

Identifiers
- IUPAC name: (±)-3-(1-Propylpiperidin-3-yl)phenol
- CAS Number: 75240-91-4 85966-89-8 ((+)-isomer)
- PubChem CID: 55445
- ChemSpider: 50067
- UNII: ND3NDM2EHM
- ChEBI: CHEBI:125440
- ChEMBL: ChEMBL276500
- CompTox Dashboard (EPA): DTXSID7048453

Chemical and physical data
- Formula: C_{14}H_{21}NO
- Molar mass: 219.328 g·mol^{−1}
- 3D model (JSmol): Interactive image
- SMILES: CCCN1CCCC(C1)C2=CC(=CC=C2)O
- InChI: InChI=1S/C14H21NO/c1-2-8-15-9-4-6-13(11-15)12-5-3-7-14(16)10-12/h3,5,7,10,13,16H,2,4,6,8-9,11H2,1H3; Key:HTSNFXAICLXZMA-UHFFFAOYSA-N

3-PPP (N-n-propyl-3-(3-hydroxyphenyl)piperidine) is a mixed sigma σ_{1} and σ_{2} receptor agonist (with similar affinity for both subtypes, though slightly higher affinity for the latter) and D_{2} receptor partial agonist which is used in scientific research. It shows stereoselectivity in its pharmacodynamics. (+)-3-PPP is the enantiomer that acts as an agonist of the sigma receptors; it is also an agonist of both D_{2} presynaptic and postsynaptic receptors. Conversely, (−)-3-PPP, also known as preclamol (INN), acts as an agonist of presynaptic D_{2} receptors but as an antagonist of postsynaptic D_{2} receptors, and has antipsychotic effects. 3-PPP has also been reported to be a monoamine reuptake inhibitor and possibly to act at adrenergic receptors or some other non-sigma receptor.

Preclamol ((–)-3-PPP) structure.

== Synthesis ==
ChemDrug Synthesis: Patent: Short & Efficient: Sino:

The Grignard reagent was prepared for 3-Bromoanisole [2398-37-0] (1) and this was reacted with 3-Bromopyridine [626-55-1] (2) to give 3-(3-methoxyphenyl)pyridine [4373-67-5] (3). Reaction with 1-bromopropane [106-94-5] occurred to give the quaternary salt PC13695099 (4a). {Alternatively catalytic hydrogenation of 3 could be attempted directly to give 3-(3-methoxyphenyl)piperidine [79601-21-1] (4b). A second reductive amination with propionic acid was then performed.} Catalytic hydrogenation of the quat cation gave 3-(3-methoxyphenyl)-1-propylpiperidine [86562-23-4] (5). Demethylation with hydrogen bromide then completed the synthesis of preclamol (6).

== See also ==
- 3-Phenylpiperidine
- List of investigational antipsychotics
- List of investigational Parkinson's disease drugs
- 4-PPBP
- Alazocine
- OSU-6162
- PF-219,061
