= Xipranolol =

Chemical compound

Clinical data
- ATC code: None

Identifiers
- IUPAC name: 1-[bis(2,6-Dimethylphenyl)methoxy]-3-(isopropylamino)propan-2-ol
- CAS Number: 19179-78-3
- PubChem CID: 65692
- ChemSpider: 59120
- UNII: ZJI41P5WMH
- ChEMBL: ChEMBL2104508
- CompTox Dashboard (EPA): DTXSID30864874

Chemical and physical data
- Formula: C_{23}H_{33}NO_{2}
- Molar mass: 355.522 g·mol^{−1}
- 3D model (JSmol): Interactive image
- SMILES: O(CC(O)CNC(C)C)C(c1c(cccc1C)C)c2c(cccc2C)C

Xipranolol is a beta blocker.

== See also ==
- Beta blocker
