= B777-81 =

Experimental antidepressant

Clinical data
- Other names: BRN 6066682

Identifiers
- IUPAC name: 4-(1-methyl-4-phenylpiperidin-4-yl)oxyaniline
- CAS Number: 78104-11-7
- PubChem CID: 3060392
- ChemSpider: 2321322
- CompTox Dashboard (EPA): DTXSID80228740

Chemical and physical data
- Formula: C_{18}H_{22}N_{2}O
- Molar mass: 282.387 g·mol^{−1}
- 3D model (JSmol): Interactive image
- SMILES: CN1CCC(CC1)(C2=CC=CC=C2)OC3=CC=C(C=C3)N
- InChI: InChI=1S/C18H22N2O/c1-20-13-11-18(12-14-20,15-5-3-2-4-6-15)21-17-9-7-16(19)8-10-17/h2-10H,11-14,19H2,1H3; Key:GNVZOTBLCYEIRW-UHFFFAOYSA-N

B-777-81 is an antidepressant drug candidate.

B777-81 works by reversing reserpine and tetrabenazine-induced ptosis in a similar manner to that of imipramine, but with a shorter duration of action. It also antagonizes reserpine-induced hypothermia but it is without effect on the decrease in locomotor activity or catalepsy following reserpine. In vitro, B777-81 inhibited 5-HT uptake in platelets, potentiated the effect of NA on isolated vas deferens and had less anticholinergic effect than imipramine in the isolated ileum.
