= KMUP-1 =

Names
- Preferred IUPAC name 7-{2-[4-(2-Chlorophenyl)piperazin-1-yl]ethyl}-1,3-dimethyl-3,7-dihydro-1H-purine-2,6-dione
- Other names 7-[2-[4-(2-Chlorophenyl)piperazinyl]ethyl]-1,3-dimethylxanthine

Identifiers
CAS Number	81996-46-5
3D model (JSmol)	Interactive image
ChemSpider	8629180
ECHA InfoCard	100.211.655
PubChem CID	10453764
UNII	1X0H7WEC5D
CompTox Dashboard (EPA)	DTXSID80440203
- InChI: InChI=1S/C19H23ClN6O2/c1-22-17-16(18(27)23(2)19(22)28)26(13-21-17)12-9-24-7-10-25(11-8-24)15-6-4-3-5-14(15)20/h3-6,13H,7-12H2,1-2H3 Key: NIDVDYQCGWISJZ-UHFFFAOYSA-N
- SMILES: CN1C2=C(C(=O)N(C1=O)C)N(C=N2)CCN3CCN(CC3)C4=CC=CC=C4Cl

Properties
Chemical formula	C_{19}H_{23}ClN_{6}O_{2}
Molar mass	402.88 g·mol^{−1}
- Except where otherwise noted, data are given for materials in their standard state (at 25 °C [77 °F], 100 kPa). Infobox references

KMUP-1 is a xanthine derivative with phosphodiesterase inhibitor activity.
