= E-52862 =

Chemical compound

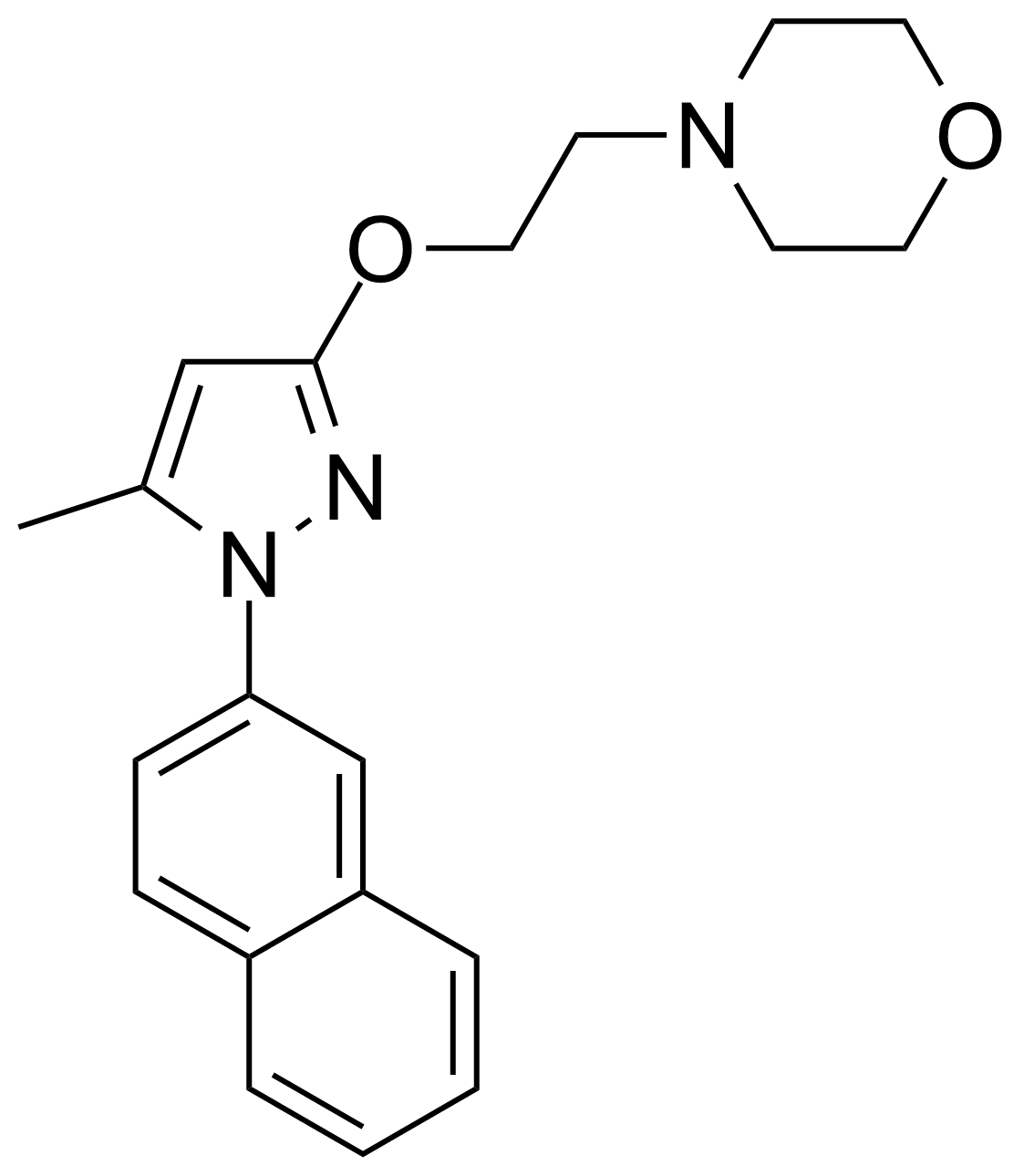

Clinical data
- Other names: S1A; S1RA; MR-309

Identifiers
- IUPAC name: 4-(2-((5-methyl-1-(naphthalen-2-yl)-1H-pyrazol-3-yl)oxy)ethyl)morpholine
- CAS Number: 878141-96-9
- ChemSpider: 28641653
- UNII: ZW18DSD1H4
- ChEMBL: ChEMBL2170062
- CompTox Dashboard (EPA): DTXSID901022521

Chemical and physical data
- Formula: C_{20}H_{23}N_{3}O_{2}
- Molar mass: 337.423 g·mol^{−1}
- 3D model (JSmol): Interactive image
- SMILES: CC1=CC(OCCN2CCOCC2)=NN1C1=CC=C2C=CC=CC2=C1
- InChI: InChI=1S/C20H23N3O2/c1-16-14-20(25-13-10-22-8-11-24-12-9-22)21-23(16)19-7-6-17-4-2-3-5-18(17)15-19/h2-7,14-15H,8-13H2,1H3; Key:DGPGXHRHNRYVDH-UHFFFAOYSA-N

E-52862, also known as sigma-1 receptor antagonist (S1A, S1RA), as well as MR-309, is a selective sigma-1 receptor antagonist, with a reported binding affinity of K_{i} = 17.0 ± 7.0 nM, selective over the sigma-2 receptor and against a panel of other 170 receptors, enzymes, transporters and ion channels. In preclinical studies, S1RA has demonstrated efficacy in relieving neuropathic pain and pain in other sensitizing conditions, associated with an improvement of the emotional negative state.

S1RA is being developed by Esteve for the treatment of neuropathic pain and the potentiation of opioid analgesia and has successfully completed Phase I clinical trials showing good safety and tolerability, and a pharmacokinetic profile compatible with once a day oral administration. Phase II clinical trials are currently underway, making S1RA the first selective sigma-1 receptor antagonist evaluated in humans for these conditions.

As of 2025, Phase II trials on human patients have made progress. In European patients with chronic postsurgical pain and painful diabetic neuropathy, the drug showed clinically significant reduction of baseline and worst pain in patients with non-spinal injuries with chronic postsurgical pain. The painful diabetic neuropathy group had a similar reduction in pain, although due to a particularly strong placebo response, more studies will be needed to detangle the true extent of the effects.

== See also ==
- List of investigational analgesics
