= 4-PPBP =

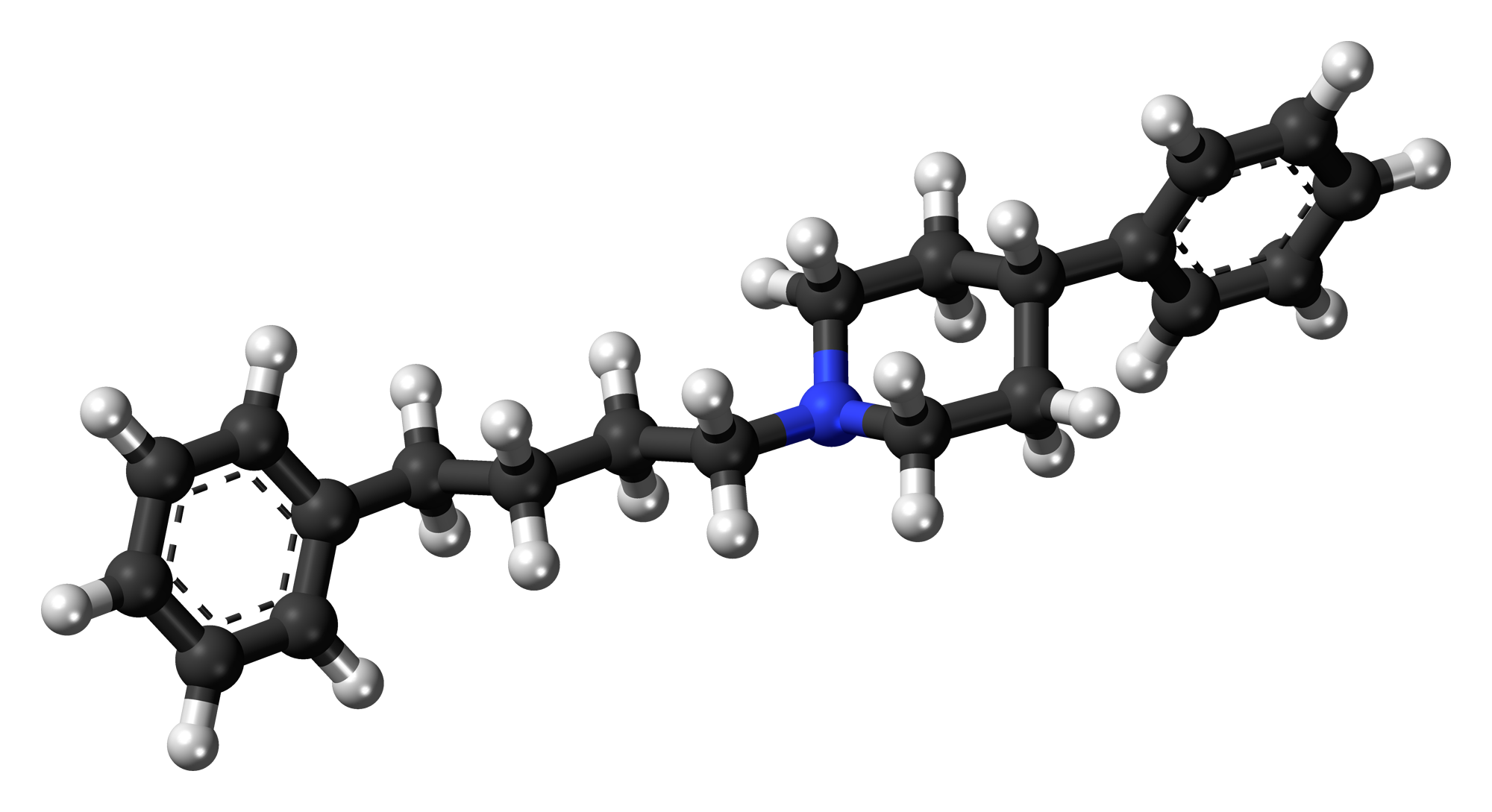

Names
- Preferred IUPAC name 4-Phenyl-1-(4-phenylbutyl)piperidine

Identifiers
CAS Number	136534-70-8
3D model (JSmol)	Interactive image; Interactive image
ChEMBL	ChEMBL325238
ChemSpider	2299855
MeSH	4-phenyl-1-(4-phenylbutyl)piperidine
PubChem CID	3035672
UNII	HDL2DSB8CH
CompTox Dashboard (EPA)	DTXSID50904029
- InChI: InChI=1S/C21H27N/c1-3-9-19(10-4-1)11-7-8-16-22-17-14-21(15-18-22)20-12-5-2-6-13-20/h1-6,9-10,12-13,21H,7-8,11,14-18H2 Key: HQGDPZPNAXRCSA-UHFFFAOYSA-N; InChI=1/C21H27N/c1-3-9-19(10-4-1)11-7-8-16-22-17-14-21(15-18-22)20-12-5-2-6-13-20/h1-6,9-10,12-13,21H,7-8,11,14-18H2 Key: HQGDPZPNAXRCSA-UHFFFAOYAV
- SMILES: C1CN(CCC1C2=CC=CC=C2)CCCCC3=CC=CC=C3; c1ccccc1C3CCN(CCCCc2ccccc2)CC3

Properties
Chemical formula	C_{21}H_{27}N
Molar mass	293.446 g/mol
- Except where otherwise noted, data are given for materials in their standard state (at 25 °C [77 °F], 100 kPa). verify (what is ?) Infobox references

4-PPBP is a neuroprotective cyclic amine which binds to sigma receptors.

4-PPBP decreases neuronal nitric oxide synthase (nNOS) activity and ischemia-evoked nitric oxide (NO) production. 4-PPBP provides neuroprotection; this involves the prevention of ischemia-induced intracellular Ca^{2+} dysregulation. 4-PPBP protects neurons using a mechanism that activates the transcription factor cyclic adenosine monophosphate response element-binding protein (CREB). Neuroprotection that is associated with 4-PPBP increases Bcl-2 expression; Bcl-2 expression is regulated by CREB.

== See also ==
- 3-PPP
