= L-687,384 =

Chemical compound

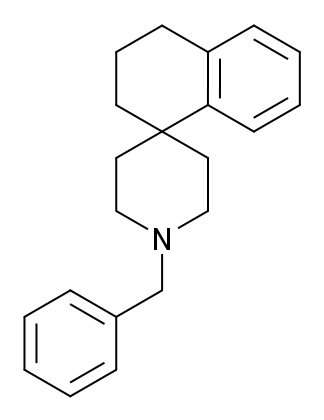

Clinical data
- ATC code: none

Identifiers
- IUPAC name: 1'-benzylspiro[2,3-dihydro-1H-naphthalene-4,4'-piperidine]
- CAS Number: 95417-67-7
- PubChem CID: 125328
- ChemSpider: 111534
- UNII: NVE9K68QA3
- ChEMBL: ChEMBL303336
- CompTox Dashboard (EPA): DTXSID30241828

Chemical and physical data
- Formula: C_{21}H_{25}N
- Molar mass: 291.438 g·mol^{−1}
- 3D model (JSmol): Interactive image
- SMILES: c3ccccc3CN2CCC1(CC2)CCCc4c1cccc4
- InChI: InChI=1S/C21H25N/c1-2-7-18(8-3-1)17-22-15-13-21(14-16-22)12-6-10-19-9-4-5-11-20(19)21/h1-5,7-9,11H,6,10,12-17H2; Key:MLDCBJPLHBPJET-UHFFFAOYSA-N

L-687,384 is a sigma receptor agonist, selective for the σ_{1} subtype, as well as an NMDA antagonist.

== See also ==
Spipethiane
