= Blarcamesine =

Medication

Clinical data
- Other names: ANAVEX 2-73
- ATC code: N06DX06 (WHO)

Identifiers
- IUPAC name: 1-(2,2-Diphenyltetrahydro-3-furanyl)-N,N-dimethylmethanamine
- CAS Number: 195615-83-9
- PubChem CID: 9882189
- DrugBank: DB05592
- ChemSpider: 8057864
- UNII: 9T210MMZ3F
- KEGG: D11383
- ChEMBL: ChEMBL4297224
- CompTox Dashboard (EPA): DTXSID60941344

Chemical and physical data
- Formula: C_{19}H_{23}NO
- Molar mass: 281.399 g·mol^{−1}
- 3D model (JSmol): Interactive image
- SMILES: O3C(c1ccccc1)(c2ccccc2)C(CN(C)C)CC3
- InChI: InChI=1S/C19H23NO/c1-20(2)15-18-13-14-21-19(18,16-9-5-3-6-10-16)17-11-7-4-8-12-17/h3-12,18H,13-15H2,1-2H3; Key:BOTHKNZTGGXFEQ-UHFFFAOYSA-N

Blarcamesine (developmental code name ANAVEX 2-73) is an experimental drug which is under development for the treatment of Alzheimer's disease and other indications.

Blarcamesine acts as an agonist of the sigma σ_{1} receptor, the muscarinic acetylcholine M_{1} receptor, and the ionotropic glutamate NMDA receptor.

The drug was developed by Anavex Life Sciences. As of August 2024, it is in preregistration for Alzheimer's disease, phase 2/3 clinical trials for fragile X syndrome and Rett syndrome, phase 2 trials for Parkinson's disease, and phase 1 trials for Angelman syndrome and infantile spasms. It was also under development for the treatment of amyotrophic lateral sclerosis (ALS), anxiety disorders, autistic spectrum disorders, cognition disorders, multiple sclerosis, and stroke, but development for these indications was discontinued.

== Pharmacology ==
=== Pharmacodynamics ===
Blarcamesine acts primarily as an agonist of the sigma σ_{1} receptor (affinity (IC_{50}) = 860 nM). To a lesser extent, it is also an agonist of the muscarinic acetylcholine M_{1} receptor (affinity = 5 μM) and of the ionotropic glutamate NMDA receptor (affinity = 8 μM).

Blarcamesine was originally tested in mice against the effect of the muscarinic receptor antagonist scopolamine, which induces learning impairment. M_{1} receptor agonists are known to reverse the amnesia caused by scopolamine. Scopolamine is used in the treatment of Parkinson's disease and motion sickness by reducing the secretions of the stomach and intestines and can also decreases nerve signals to the stomach. This is via competitive inhibition of muscarinic receptors. Muscarinic receptors are involved in the formation of both short term and long term memories. Experiments in mice have found that M_{1} and M_{3} receptor agonists inhibit the formation of β-amyloid and target GSK-3B. Furthermore, stimulation of the M_{1} receptor activates AF267B, which in turn blocks β-secretase, which cleaves the amyloid precursor protein to produce the amyloid-beta peptide. These β-amyloid peptides aggregate together to form plaques. This enzyme is involved in the formation of Tau plaques, which are common in Alzheimer's disease. Therefore, M_{1} receptor activation appears to decreases tau hyperphosphorylation and β-amyloid accumulation.

σ_{1} receptor activation appears to be only involved in long-term memory processes. This partly explains why blarcamesine seems to be more effective in reversing scopolamine-induced long-term memory problems compared to short-term memory deficits. The σ_{1} receptor is located on mitochondria-associated endoplasmic reticulum membranes and modulates the ER stress response and local calcium exchanges with the mitochondria. Blarcamesine prevented Aβ25-35-induced increases in lipid peroxidation levels, Bax/Bcl-2 ratio and cytochrome c release into the cytosol, which are indicative of elevated toxicity. Blarcamesine inhibits mitochondrial respiratory dysfunction and therefore prevents against oxidative stress and apoptosis. This drug prevented the appearance of oxidative stress. Blarcamesine also exhibits anti-apoptotic and anti-oxidant activity. This is due in part because σ_{1} receptor agonists stimulate the anti-apoptotic factor Bcl-2 due to reactive oxygen species dependent transcriptional activation of nuclear factor kB. Results from Maurice (2016) found that σ_{1} receptor agonists may offer a protective potential, both alone and possibly with other agents like donepezil, an acetylcholinesterase inhibitor, or memantine, a NMDA receptor antagonist.

== Synthesis ==
The synthesis of blarcamesine is via the following method: (Precursor:)

The reaction between benzophenone [119-61-9] and succinic anhydride [108-30-5] in the presence of zinc chloride give 2,2-diphenyloxolane-3-carboxylic acid, PC151808451 (1). The halogenation of with thionyl chloride (2) followed by dimethylamine gives the amide and hence N,N-dimethyl-5-oxo-2,2-diphenyloxolane-3-carboxamide, PC15187451 (3). Strong reduction with lithium aluminium hydride both removes the amide carbonyl as well as reduces the butyrophenone moiety giving a diol and hence 2-[(dimethylamino)methyl]-1,1-diphenylbutane-1,4-diol, PC15187448 (4). Acid catalyzed ring closure completed the synthesis of blarcamesine (5).

== Society and culture ==
=== Legal status ===
In December 2025, the Committee for Medicinal Products for Human Use of the European Medicines Agency recommended the refusal of a marketing authorization for Blarcamesine Anavex, a medicine intended for the treatment of Alzheimer's disease. The applicant for this medicinal product is Anavex Germany GmbH. A request was made by the applicant for the committee to re-examine its opinion.

== Research ==
In trials for Alzheimer's disease, Anavex Life Sciences reported that in patients with a fully functional SIGMAR1 gene, which encodes the σ_{1} receptor targeted by blarcamesine, the drug improved cognition as measured by the mini-mental state examination (MMSE) by 14% after 70 weeks of treatment. Competence in activities of daily living was improved by 8% in the same subgroup of patients. Additionally, in trials for Parkinson's disease, episodic memory was significantly improved after 14 weeks of treatment.

== See also ==
- List of investigational cognition and memory disorder drugs
- List of investigational Parkinson's disease drugs
- ANAVEX 1-41
- ANAVEX 3-71 (AF710B)
