= PD 144418 =

Chemical compound

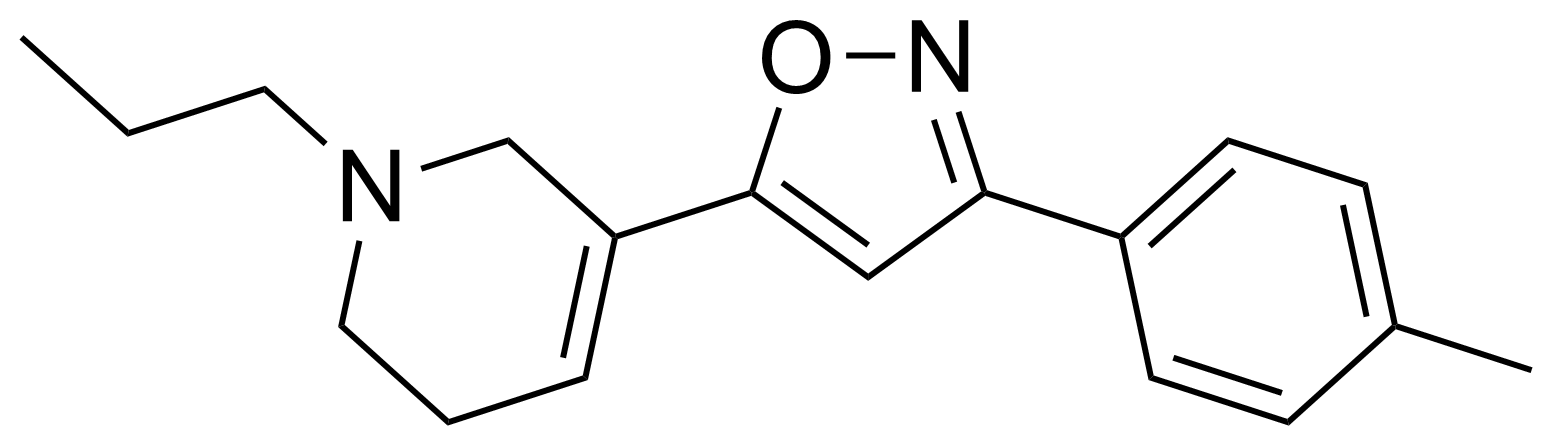

Identifiers
- IUPAC name: 1,2,3,6-tetrahydro-5-[3-(4-methylphenyl)-5-isoxazolyl]-1-propylpyridine
- CAS Number: 154130-99-1
- ChemSpider: 7992981
- UNII: FV9595VZB7
- CompTox Dashboard (EPA): DTXSID101336203 DTXSID90703437, DTXSID101336203

Chemical and physical data
- Formula: C_{18}H_{22}N_{2}O
- Molar mass: 282.387 g·mol^{−1}
- 3D model (JSmol): Interactive image
- SMILES: CCCN1CCC=C(C1)C2=CC(=NO2)C3=CC=C(C=C3)C
- InChI: InChI=1S/C18H22N2O/c1-3-10-20-11-4-5-16(13-20)18-12-17(19-21-18)15-8-6-14(2)7-9-15/h5-9,12H,3-4,10-11,13H2,1-2H3; Key:FOQRKFCLRMMKAT-UHFFFAOYSA-N

PD 144418 or 1,2,3,6-tetrahydro-5-[3-(4-methylphenyl)-5-isoxazolyl]-1-propylpyridine is a potent and selective ligand for the sigma-1 receptor, with a reported binding affinity of K_{i} = 0.08 ± 0.01 nM, and 17,212 times selectivity over the sigma-2 receptor.
