= Ditolylguanidine =

Experimental drug

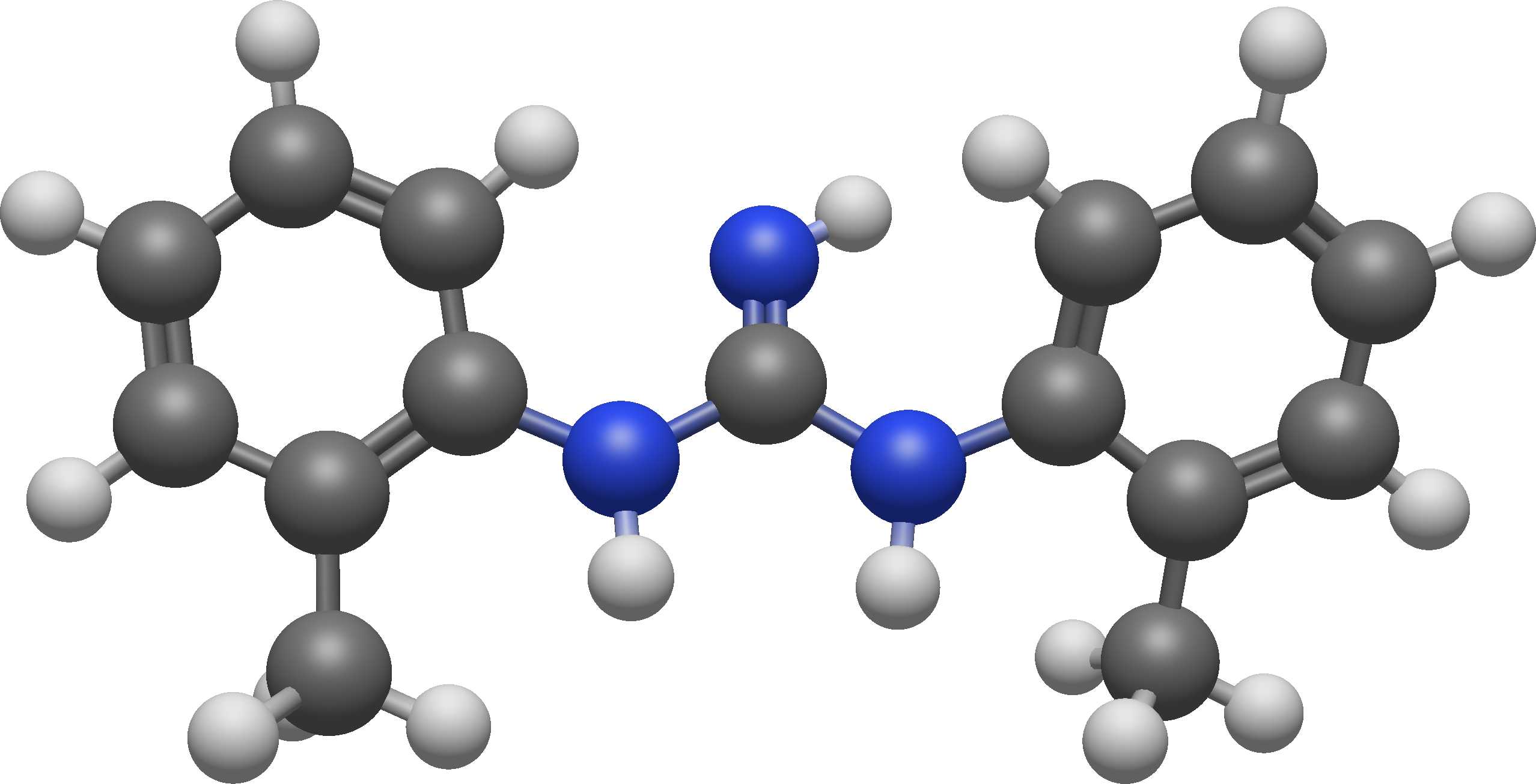

Clinical data
- ATC code: none

Identifiers
- IUPAC name: 1,2-bis(2-methylphenyl)guanidine
- CAS Number: 97-39-2
- PubChem CID: 7333
- IUPHAR/BPS: 6684
- ChemSpider: 7056
- UNII: LL2P01I17O
- ChEMBL: ChEMBL282433
- CompTox Dashboard (EPA): DTXSID2026606
- ECHA InfoCard: 100.002.344

Chemical and physical data
- Formula: C_{15}H_{17}N_{3}
- Molar mass: 239.322 g·mol^{−1}
- 3D model (JSmol): Interactive image
- SMILES: N(=C(/Nc1ccccc1C)N)\c2ccccc2C
- InChI: InChI=1S/C15H17N3/c1-11-7-3-5-9-13(11)17-15(16)18-14-10-6-4-8-12(14)2/h3-10H,1-2H3,(H3,16,17,18); Key:OPNUROKCUBTKLF-UHFFFAOYSA-N

Ditolylguanidine (DTG) is a sigma receptor agonist. It is somewhat selective for sigma receptors, but non-selective between the two sigma receptor subtypes, binding to both σ_{1} and σ_{2} with equal affinity. It has neuroprotective and antidepressant effects, and potentiates the effects of NMDA antagonists.

== Properties ==
N,N′-Di-o-tolylguanidine is a flammable, white solid that is practically insoluble in water. It decomposes upon heating, potentially releasing nitrogen oxides, carbon monoxide, and carbon dioxide.

== Safety Information ==
N,N′-Di-o-tolylguanidine is not itself carcinogenic, but due to the manufacturing process, it may still contain o-toluidine, which is carcinogenic. Therefore, if the o-toluidine content exceeds 0.1 percent, the mixture should be considered carcinogenic.

== See also ==
- Aptiganel
