= Sigma receptor =

Class of cell surface receptors

ERG2/Sigma-1 receptor

Identifiers
- Symbol: ERG2_Sigma1R
- Pfam: PF04622
- InterPro: IPR006716
- TCDB: 8.A.63
- OPM superfamily: 446
- OPM protein: 5hk1
- Membranome: 1025
Available protein structures:
- PDB: IPR006716 PF04622 (ECOD; PDBsum)
- AlphaFold: IPR006716; PF04622

Sigma intracellular receptor 2

Identifiers
- Symbol: Sigma2
- InterPro: IPR016964
Available protein structures:
- PDB: IPR016964
- AlphaFold: IPR016964

Sigma receptors (σ-receptors) are protein receptors that bind ligands such as 4-PPBP (4-phenyl-1-(4-phenylbutyl) piperidine), SA 4503 (cutamesine), ditolylguanidine, dimethyltryptamine, and siramesine. There are two subtypes, sigma-1 receptors (σ_{1}) and sigma-2 receptors (σ_{2}), which are classified as sigma receptors for their pharmacological similarities, even though they are evolutionarily unrelated. Some early literature proposed a third subtype ("sigma-3") based on phenylaminotetralin (PAT) ligands, but later work showed this binding corresponded to the histamine H1 receptor; "sigma-3" is not recognized in current nomenclature.

The fungal protein ERG2, a C-8 sterol isomerase, falls into the same protein family as sigma-1. Both localize to the ER membrane, although sigma-1 is also reported to be a cell surface receptor. Sigma-2 is an EXPERA domain protein with a mostly intracellular (ER membrane) localization.

== Classification ==
Because the σ-receptor was originally discovered to be agonized by benzomorphan opioids and antagonized by naltrexone, σ-receptors were originally believed to be a type of opioid receptor. When the σ_{1} receptor was isolated and cloned, it was found to have no structural similarity to the opioid receptors, but rather showed similarity to fungal proteins involved in sterol synthesis. At this point, they were designated as a separate class of proteins.

=== Putative sigma-3 receptor ===
In the early 1990s, a "sigma-3" binding site was proposed based on phenylaminotetralin (PAT) ligands and functional assays that linked PAT binding to stimulation of tyrosine hydroxylase and dopamine synthesis in rodent brain. Subsequent pharmacological and radioligand-binding studies demonstrated that these so-called sigma-3 sites correspond to histamine H1 receptors rather than a distinct sigma receptor subtype. As a result, contemporary classifications recognize only sigma-1 and sigma-2 receptors.

== Function ==
The function of these receptors is poorly understood. Drugs known to be σ-agonists include cocaine, morphine/diacetylmorphine, opipramol, PCP, fluvoxamine, methamphetamine, dextromethorphan, and berberine. However, the exact role of σ-receptors is difficult to establish as many σ-agonists also bind to other targets such as the κ-opioid receptor and the NMDA glutamate receptor. In animal experiments, σ-antagonists such as rimcazole were able to block convulsions from cocaine overdose. σ-antagonists are also under investigation for use as antipsychotic medications. Early rodent studies reported that σ-receptor ligands can functionally antagonize opioid analgesia: (+)-pentazocine and 1,3-di(2-tolyl)guanidine reduced morphine analgesia in a haloperidol-reversible, D2-independent manner, consistent with a tonically active anti-opioid σ1 system.

The abundant neurosteroid steroid hormone DHEA is an agonist at sigma receptors and along with pregnenolone could be endogenous agonist ligands; opposed by sigma antagonistic activity from progesterone. Another endogenous ligand, dimethyltryptamine (DMT), was also found to interact with σ_{1}.

== Physiologic effects ==
Physiologic effects when the σ-receptor is activated include hypertonia, tachycardia, tachypnea, antitussive effects, and mydriasis. Some σ-receptor agonists—such as cocaine, a weak σ-agonist—exert convulsant effects in animals.

In 2007, selective σ-receptor agonists were shown to produce antidepressant-like effects in mice.

σ-receptors were also shown to have a role in the regulation of iron/heme homeostasis.

In mice, σ1 activation attenuated μ-, κ-, and δ-opioid analgesia without altering morphine's effects on gastrointestinal transit or lethality, while σ blockade with haloperidol enhanced analgesia and eliminated strain differences in κ-agonist sensitivity.

== Ligands ==
=== Agonists ===
- Choline
- 3-MeO-PCP: selective for σ_{1} subtype, Ki = 42nM
- 4-PPBP
- Afobazole: selective for σ_{1} subtype
- Allylnormetazocine (SKF-10047)
- Amantadine
- Amitriptyline
- Anavex 2-73
- Arketamine
- BD1031: selective for σ_{1} subtype
- BD1052: selective for σ_{1} subtype
- Berberine
- Citalopram
- Cocaine
- Dehydroepiandrosterone (DHEA)
- Dehydroepiandrosterone sulfate (DHEA-S)
- Dextromethorphan (DXM): relatively selective for σ_{1} subtype
- Dextrorphan
- Dimethyltryptamine (DMT)
- Dimemorfan
- Ditolylguanidine
- Escitalopram
- Fluoxetine
- Fluvoxamine
- Igmesine
- Ketamine
- L-687,384: selective for σ_{1} subtype (& Spipethiane).
- Memantine: selective for σ_{1} subtype, low affinity
- Methamphetamine
- Methylphenidate
- Noscapine
- OPC-14523
- Opipramol
- PB-28: selective for σ_{2} subtype
- Pentazocine
- Pentoxyverine: selective for σ_{1} subtype
- Phencyclidine
- (+)-3-PPP
- PRE-084: selective for σ_{1} subtype
- Pregnenolone
- Pregnenolone sulfate
- SA 4503: selective for σ_{1} subtype
- Siramesine
- UMB23
- UMB82

=== Antagonists ===
- AC927
- AHD1
- AZ-66
- BD1008
- BD-1047: selective for σ_{1} subtype
- BD1060: selective for σ_{1} subtype
- BD1063: selective for σ_{1} subtype
- BD1067
- BMY-14802
- CM156: 3-(4-(4-cyclohexylpiperazin-1-yl)butyl)benzo[d]thiazole-2(3H)-thione
- E-5842
- Haloperidol
- LR132: selective for σ_{1} subtype
- LR172
- MS-377: selective for σ_{1} subtype
- NE-100: selective for σ_{1} subtype
- Panamesine
- Phenothiazines
- Progesterone
- Rimcazole
- S1RA (E-52862): selective for σ_{1} subtype
- Sertraline
- UMB 98 & UMB 99
- UMB100
- UMB101
- UMB103
- UMB116
- YZ-011
- YZ-067
- YZ-069
- YZ-185
