= NE-100 =

Chemical compound

Identifiers
- IUPAC name: 4-Methoxy-3-(2-phenylethoxy)-N,N-dipropylbenzeneethanamine
- CAS Number: 149860-29-7
- PubChem CID: 9841596
- IUPHAR/BPS: 6679
- ChemSpider: 8017311
- UNII: RN9I7K5RVN
- CompTox Dashboard (EPA): DTXSID701030382

Chemical and physical data
- Formula: C_{23}H_{33}NO_{2}
- Molar mass: 355.522 g·mol^{−1}
- 3D model (JSmol): Interactive image
- SMILES: CCCN(CCC)CCC1=CC(=C(C=C1)OC)OCCC2=CC=CC=C2
- InChI: InChI=1S/C23H33NO2/c1-4-15-24(16-5-2)17-13-21-11-12-22(25-3)23(19-21)26-18-14-20-9-7-6-8-10-20/h6-12,19H,4-5,13-18H2,1-3H3; Key:YBLIQJGXRLZBCZ-UHFFFAOYSA-N

NE-100 or 4-methoxy-3-(2-phenylethoxy)-N,N-dipropylbenzeneethanamine is a selective sigma-1 receptor antagonist, with a reported binding affinity of K_{i} = 1.03 ± 0.01 nM, and more than 205 times selectivity over the sigma-2 receptor.

NE-100 was one of the earliest selective sigma-1 receptor ligands reported and has been widely used as a pharmacological tool. The original, eight step synthesis of NE-100 was reported by Atsuro Nakazato and colleagues of Taisho Pharmaceutical Company in 1999. More recently, Michael Kassiou and co-workers have reported a more expedient synthesis of NE-100 that proceeds in 56% unoptimized yield over 4 steps.
