= LR132 =

Chemical compound

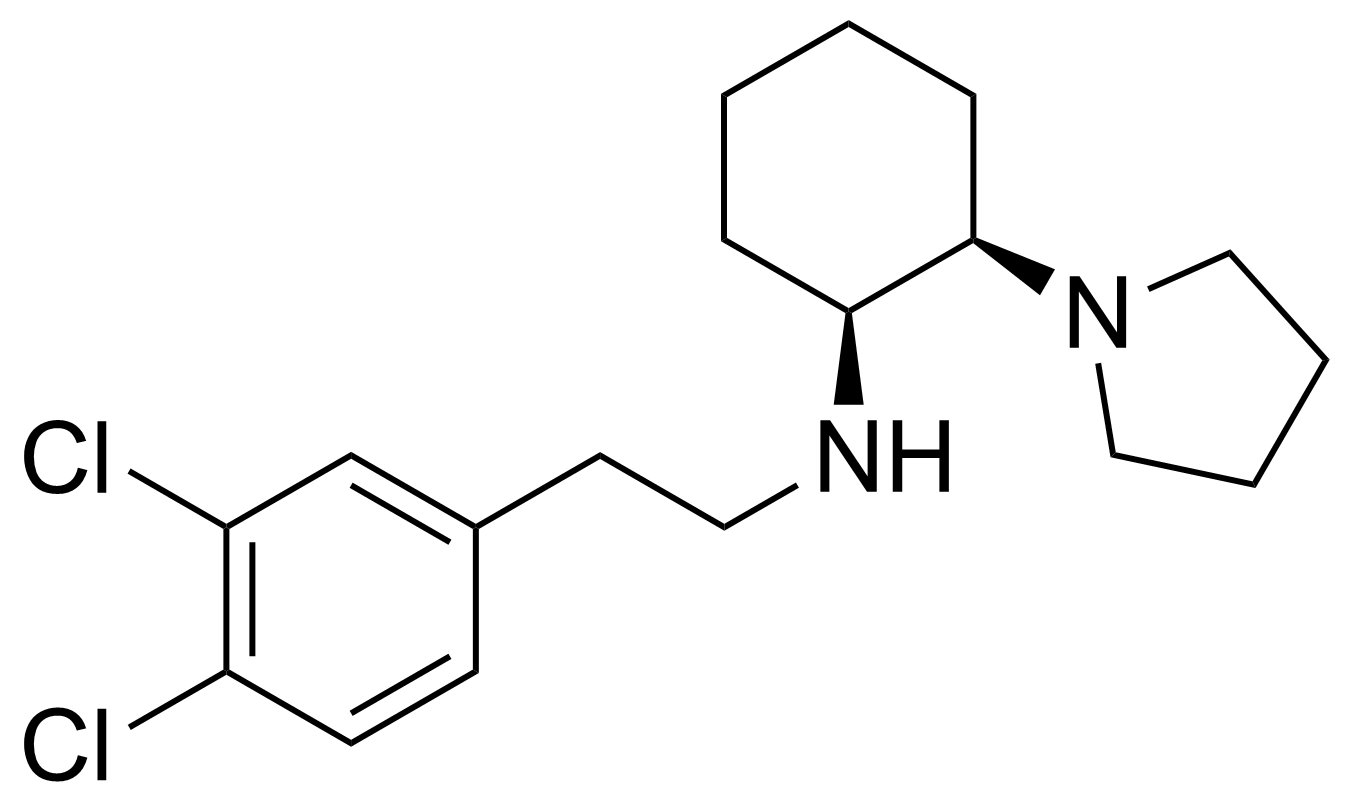

Identifiers
- IUPAC name: (+)-3,4-dichloro-N-[(1R,2S)-2-(1-pyrrolidinyl)cyclohexyl]benzeneethanamine
- CAS Number: 135211-15-3
- PubChem CID: 5471948
- ChemSpider: 4581994
- UNII: K7C7XKK3P3
- ChEMBL: ChEMBL320828
- CompTox Dashboard (EPA): DTXSID201030387

Chemical and physical data
- Formula: C_{18}H_{26}Cl_{2}N_{2}
- Molar mass: 341.32 g·mol^{−1}
- 3D model (JSmol): Interactive image
- SMILES: c1cc(c(cc1CCN[C@H]2CCCC[C@H]2N3CCCC3)Cl)Cl
- InChI: InChI=1S/C18H26Cl2N2/c19-15-8-7-14(13-16(15)20)9-10-21-17-5-1-2-6-18(17)22-11-3-4-12-22/h7-8,13,17-18,21H,1-6,9-12H2/t17-,18+/m0/s1; Key:NREHOBGKKWFKES-ZWKOTPCHSA-N

LR132 or (+)-3,4-dichloro-N-[(1R,2S)-2-(1-pyrrolidinyl)cyclohexyl]benzeneethanamine is a selective sigma receptor antagonist, with a reported binding affinity of K_{i} = 2 ± 0.1 nM for the sigma-1 receptor and more than 350 times selectivity over the sigma-2 receptor.

Consistent with other reported sigma receptor antagonists, pretreating Swiss Webster mice with LR132 significantly decreases the convulsivity and lethality of cocaine.

== See also ==
- BD1008
- BD1031
