= BD1008 =

Chemical compound

Identifiers
- IUPAC name: N-[2-(3,4-Dichlorophenyl)ethyl]-N-methyl-1-pyrrolidineethanamine
- CAS Number: 138356-08-8
- PubChem CID: 126388
- ChemSpider: 112324
- UNII: JCY43QE7FQ
- CompTox Dashboard (EPA): DTXSID60160639

Chemical and physical data
- Formula: C_{15}H_{22}Cl_{2}N_{2}
- Molar mass: 301.26 g·mol^{−1}
- 3D model (JSmol): Interactive image
- SMILES: CN(CCc1ccc(c(c1)Cl)Cl)CCN2CCCC2
- InChI: InChI=1S/C15H22Cl2N2/c1-18(10-11-19-7-2-3-8-19)9-6-13-4-5-14(16)15(17)12-13/h4-5,12H,2-3,6-11H2,1H3; Key:ASGIQUHBAVIOTI-UHFFFAOYSA-N

BD1008 (N-[2-(3,4-dichlorophenyl)ethyl]-N-methyl-1-pyrrolidineethanamine) is a selective sigma receptor antagonist, with a reported binding affinity of K_{i} = 2 ± 1 nM for the sigma-1 receptor and 4 times selectivity over the sigma-2 receptor.

Consistent with other reported sigma receptor antagonists, pretreating Swiss Webster mice with BD1008 significantly attenuates the behavioral toxicity of cocaine, and may be potentially useful in the development of antidotes for the treatment of cocaine overdose.

== See also ==
- BD1031
- LR132
