= BD1031 =

Chemical compound

Identifiers
- IUPAC name: (R)-2-[2-(3,4-dichlorophenyl)ethyl]octahydropyrrolo[1,2-a]pyrazine
- CAS Number: 150208-44-9
- ChemSpider: 23166168
- UNII: CVF7AS78X7

Chemical and physical data
- Formula: C_{15}H_{20}Cl_{2}N_{2}
- Molar mass: 299.24 g·mol^{−1}
- 3D model (JSmol): Interactive image
- SMILES: c1cc(c(cc1CCN2CCN3CCC[C@@H]3C2)Cl)Cl
- InChI: InChI=1S/C15H20Cl2N2/c16-14-4-3-12(10-15(14)17)5-7-18-8-9-19-6-1-2-13(19)11-18/h3-4,10,13H,1-2,5-9,11H2/t13-/m1/s1; Key:IGVDQXLOMXGWKN-CYBMUJFWSA-N

BD1031 or (R)-2-[2-(3,4-dichlorophenyl)ethyl]octahydropyrrolo[1,2-a]pyrazine is a selective sigma receptor agonist, with a reported binding affinity of K_{i} = 1 ± 0.2 nM for the sigma-1 receptor and 80 times selectivity over the sigma-2 receptor. The enantiomer of BD1031 is known as BD1018.

Consistent with other reported sigma receptor agonists, BD1031 increases the behavioural toxicity of cocaine in Swiss Webster mice.

== See also ==
- BD1008
