= Sigma-1 receptor =

Chaperone protein

SIGMAR1
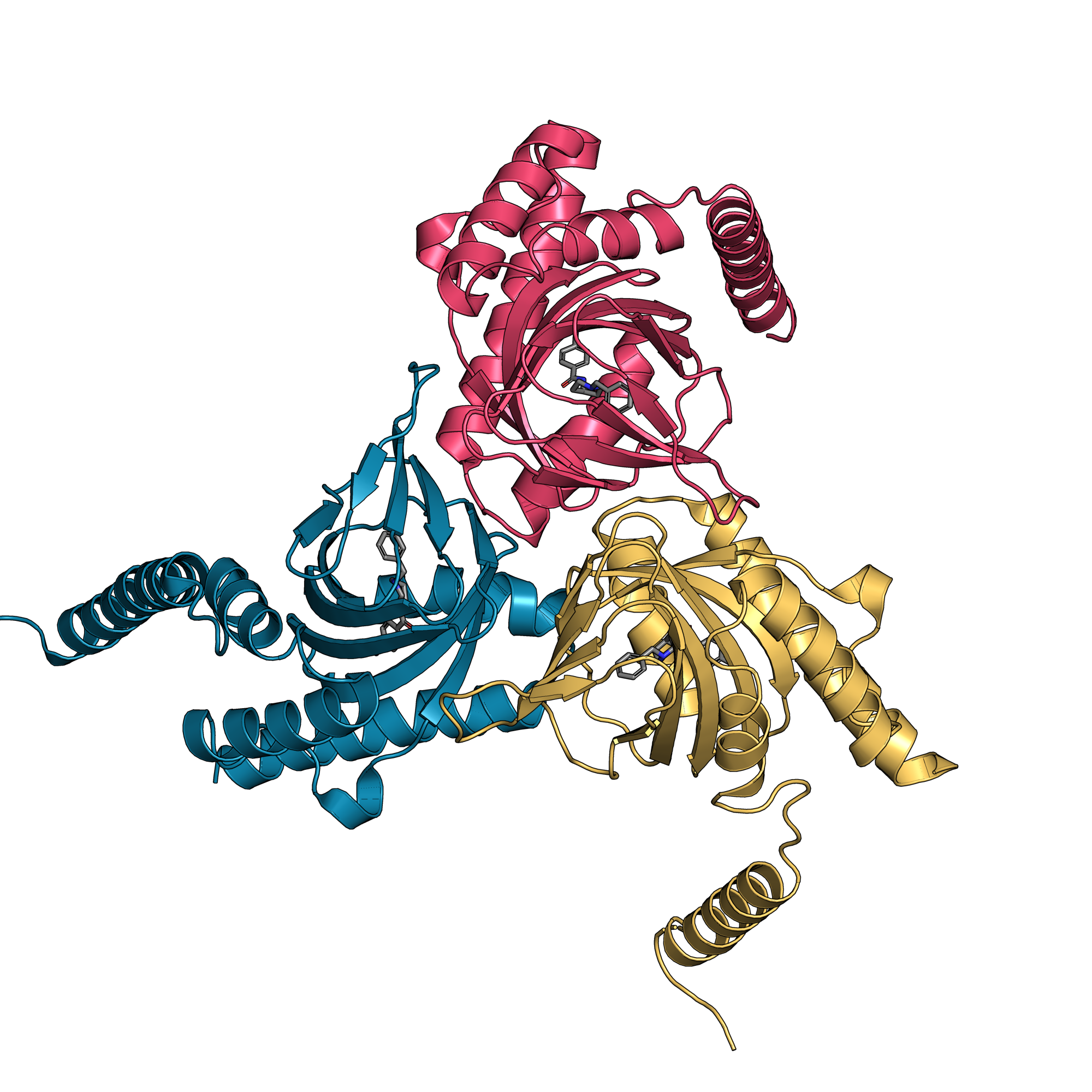
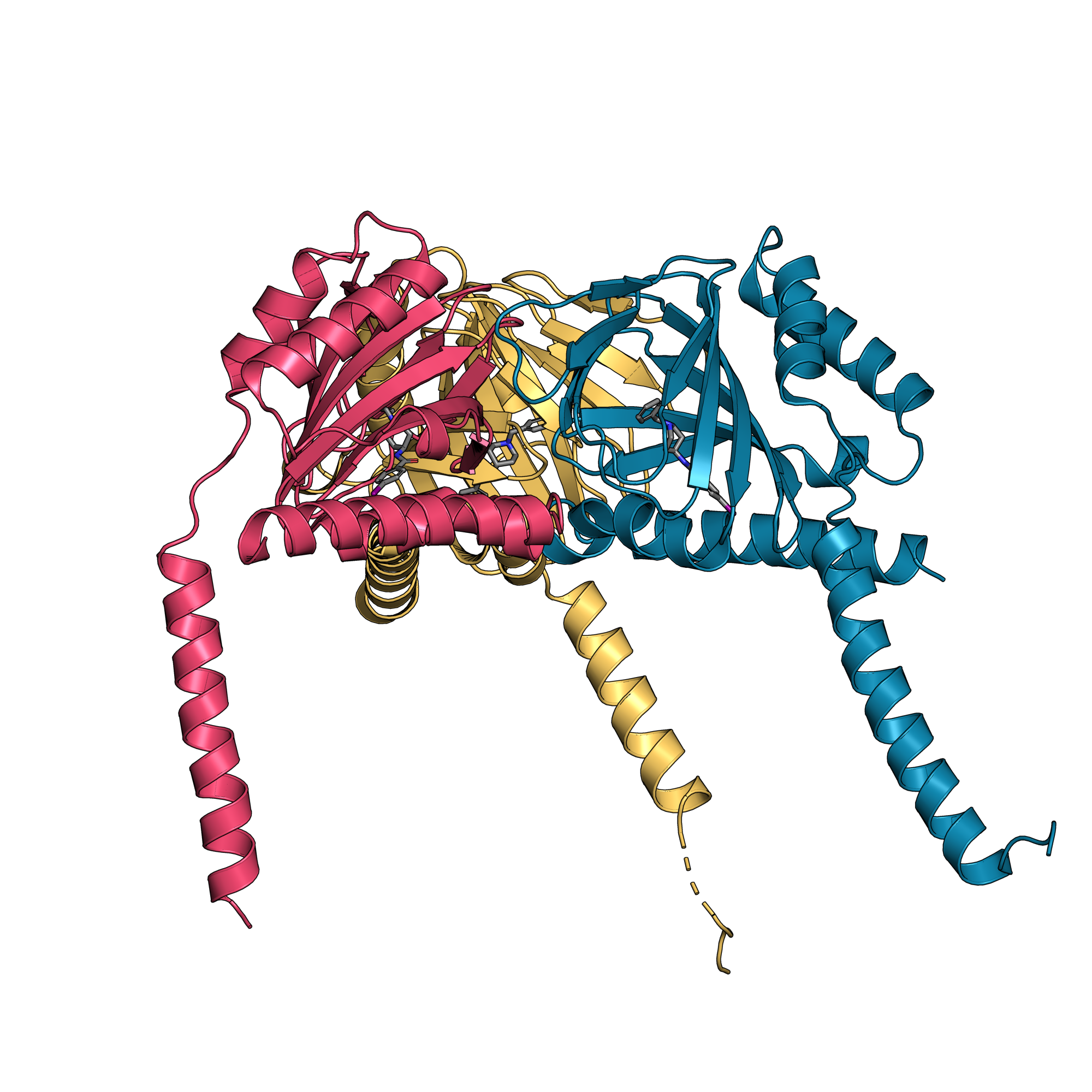

Identifiers
- Aliases: SIGMAR1, ALS16, OPRS1, SIG-1R, SR-BP, SR-BP1, SRBP, hSigmaR1, sigma1R, DSMA2, sigma non-opioid intracellular receptor 1
- External IDs: OMIM: 601978; MGI: 1195268; GeneCards: SIGMAR1
Available structures
PDB	Ortholog search: PDBe RCSB
PDB	List of PDB id codes 5HK1, 5HK2, 6DJZ, 6DK0, 6DK1

Gene location (Human)
Chr.	Chromosome 9 (human)
Band	9p13.3	Start	34,634,722 bp
Band	9p13.3	End	34,637,844 bp

Gene location (Mouse)
Chr.	Chromosome 4 (mouse)
Band	4|4 A5	Start	41,738,493 bp
Band	4|4 A5	End	41,756,157 bp
RNA expression pattern
Bgee	Human / Mouse (ortholog); Top expressed in: right lobe of liver; stromal cell of endometrium; right coronary artery; ectocervix; left uterine tube; right adrenal gland; right adrenal cortex; canal of the cervix; left adrenal gland; left coronary artery / Top expressed in: left lobe of liver; tail of embryo; epiblast; lip; embryo; right kidney; yolk sac; embryo; superior frontal gyrus; primary visual cortex; More reference expression data
BioGPS	n/a
Gene ontology
Molecular function	G protein-coupled opioid receptor activity; identical protein binding; signaling receptor activity
Cellular component	postsynaptic membrane; cell projection; endoplasmic reticulum membrane; membrane; growth cone; lipid droplet; plasma membrane; synapse; integral component of plasma membrane; cell junction; nuclear inner membrane; nuclear outer membrane; nucleus; nuclear envelope; endoplasmic reticulum; integral component of membrane; cytoplasmic vesicle; postsynaptic density
Biological process	lipid transport; regulation of neuron apoptotic process; nervous system development; G protein-coupled opioid receptor signaling pathway; protein homotrimerization; signal transduction; cell death in response to hydrogen peroxide
Sources:Amigo / QuickGO
Orthologs
Databases	NCBI: entry; OMA: entry
Species	Human	Mouse
Entrez	10280	18391
Ensembl	ENSG00000147955	ENSMUSG00000036078
UniProt	Q99720	O55242
RefSeq (mRNA)	NM_001282205; NM_001282206; NM_001282207; NM_001282208; NM_001282209 NM_005866; NM_147157; NM_147158; NM_147159; NM_147160	NM_011014; NM_001286538; NM_001286539; NM_001286540; NM_001286541 NM_001286542; NM_001286551; NM_001286605
RefSeq (protein)	NP_001269134; NP_001269135; NP_001269136; NP_001269137; NP_001269138 NP_005857; NP_671513	NP_001273467; NP_001273468; NP_001273469; NP_001273470; NP_001273471 NP_001273480; NP_001273534; NP_035144
Location (UCSC)	Chr 9: 34.63 – 34.64 Mb	Chr 4: 41.74 – 41.76 Mb
PubMed search
- Wikidata
View/Edit Human	View/Edit Mouse

The sigma-1 receptor (σ_{1}R), one of two sigma receptor subtypes, is a chaperone protein at the endoplasmic reticulum (ER) that modulates calcium signaling through the IP3 receptor. In humans, the σ_{1} receptor is encoded by the SIGMAR1 gene.

The σ_{1} receptor is a transmembrane protein expressed in many different tissue types. It is particularly concentrated in certain regions of the central nervous system. It has been implicated in several phenomena, including cardiovascular function, schizophrenia, clinical depression, the effects of cocaine abuse, bipolar disorder, and cancer. Much is known about the binding affinity of hundreds of synthetic compounds to the σ_{1} receptor.

An endogenous ligand for the σ_{1} receptor has yet to be conclusively identified, but tryptaminergic trace amines and neuroactive steroids have been found to activate the receptor. Especially progesterone, but also testosterone, pregnenolone sulfate, dimethyltryptamine (DMT) and dehydroepiandrosterone sulfate (DHEA-S) bind to the σ_{1} receptor.

== Structure ==
The mammalian σ_{1} receptor is an integral membrane protein composed of 223 amino acids. Despite being found in mammals, it shows no sequence homology to other mammalian proteins. However, it shares 30% sequence identity and 69% similarity with the ERG2 gene product of yeast, a C8–C7 sterol isomerase involved in the ergosterol biosynthesis pathway. Hydropathy analysis reveals three hydrophobic regions within the σ_{1} receptor. A crystal structure of the human σ_{1} receptor was first published in 2016.

The sigma-1 receptor is a small, unique integral membrane protein predominantly localized to the endoplasmic reticulum (ER). It is structurally distinct from all other known mammalian proteins. High-resolution crystal structures have shown that the receptor forms a homotrimer, with each protomer consisting of a single N-terminal transmembrane helix, a cupin-like β-barrel domain that contains the ligand-binding site, and a C-terminal V-shaped two-helix bundle that functions as a lid over this pocket. The ligand-binding pocket is highly conserved and predominantly hydrophobic, shielded from the aqueous environment. Key residues such as Glu172 and Asp126 play crucial roles in coordinating ligand interactions. This structural organization enables the receptor to bind a wide variety of ligands and interact with multiple effector proteins. Conformational changes in the β-barrel domain and the helical lid are believed to regulate ligand access and receptor activation. The receptor's architecture supports its function as a chaperone and modulator of numerous intracellular signaling pathways.

== Function ==
A variety of specific physiological functions have been attributed to the σ_{1} receptor. Chief among these are modulation of Ca^{2+} release, modulation of cardiac myocyte contractility, and inhibition of voltage gated K^{+} channels. The reasons for these effects are not well understood, even though σ_{1} receptors have been linked circumstantially to a wide variety of signal transduction pathways. Links between σ_{1} receptors and G-proteins have been suggested such as σ_{1} receptor antagonists showing GTP-sensitive high-affinity binding; there is also, however, some evidence against a G-protein coupled hypothesis. The σ_{1} receptor has been shown to appear in a complex with voltage gated K^{+} channels (K_{v}1.4 and K_{v}1.5), leading to the idea that σ_{1} receptors are auxiliary subunits. σ_{1} receptors apparently co-localize with IP_{3} receptors on the endoplasmic reticulum where they may be involved in preventing endoplasmic reticulum stress in neurodegenerative diseases. Also, σ_{1} receptors have been shown to appear in galactoceramide enriched domains at the endoplasmic reticulum of mature oligodendrocytes. The wide scope and effect of ligand binding on σ_{1} receptors has led some to believe that σ_{1} receptors are intracellular signal transduction amplifiers.

Recently, σ_{1}R has been implicated in autophagosome formation and maturation. Autophagy is a broad homeostatic, metabolic, cytoplasmic quality control, and metabolic process affecting many functions in the cell. σ_{1}R is targeted by the nsp6 protein of SARS-CoV-2 to inhibit autophagosome formation as a process competing with the coronavirus for cellular endomembranes that the virus needs for its own replication. This along with the observed beneficial effects of sigma-1 receptor agonist and SSRI fluvoxamine in patients with SARS-COV-2 infection has led to the hypothesis that the sigma-1 receptor could be a target for the treatment of SARS-COV-2.

== Pharmacology ==
The σ_{1} receptor is defined by its unique pharmacological profile. In 1976 Martin reported that the effects of N-allylnormetazocine (SKF-10,047) could not be due to activity at the μ and κ receptors (named from the first letter of their selective ligands morphine and ketazocine, respectively) and a new type of opioid receptor was proposed; σ (from the first letter of SKF-10,047). The opioid classification was eventually dropped however resulting from it not possessing the canonical opioid G-protein coupled receptor structure and the receptor was later referred to as simply the σ_{1} receptor. It was found to have affinity for the (+)-stereoisomers of several benzomorphans (e.g., (+)-pentazocine and (+)-cyclazocine), as well as various structurally and pharmacologically distinct psychoactive chemicals such as haloperidol (which irreversibly blocks this receptor) and cocaine, and neuroactive steroids like progesterone. Pharmacological studies with σ_{1} agonists often follow a bell-shaped dose-response curve. Thus care should be taken when designing experiments and choosing doses of ligands.

== Ligands ==
The following ligands have high affinity for the σ_{1} receptor and possess high binding selectivity over the subtype σ_{2}:

=== Agonists ===
- Amantadine
- Amitriptyline
- Blarcamesine
- Citalopram
- Cocaine
- Cutamesine
- Dextromethorphan
- Dimethoxanate
- Dimethyltryptamine
- Dipentylammonium chloride
- Donepezil
- Fabomotizole
- Fluoxetine
- Fluvoxamine
- L-687,384
- Methamphetamine
- Opipramol
- (+)-Pentazocine (the "unnatural" enantiomer, which lacks affinity for the μ-opioid and κ-opioid receptors.)
- Pipazetate
- Pitolisant
- PRE-084

=== Antagonists ===
- BD 1047
- LMH-2
- FTC-146 / CM304
- S1RA (E-52862)
- NE-100
- WQ-1
- 1-benzyl-6′-methoxy-6′,7′-dihydrospiro[piperidine-4,4′-thieno[3.2-c]pyran]: putative antagonist, selective against 5-HT_{1A}, 5-HT_{6}, 5-HT_{7}, α_{1A} and α_{2} adrenergic, and NMDA receptors

=== Inverse agonists ===
- Sertraline

=== Positive allosteric modulators (PAMs) ===
- Methylphenylpiracetam
- SOMCL-668

=== Uncategorized ===
- Clorgiline
- D-Deprenyl
- PD 144418
- RHL-033
- Selegiline
- 4-IPBS
- Spipethiane
- (−)-(S)-4-methyl-1-[2-(4-chlorophenoxy)-1-methylethyl]piperidine
- 1'-[(4-fluorophenyl)methyl]spiro[1H-isobenzofuran-3,4'-piperidine]
- 1'-benzyl-6-methoxy-1-phenyl-spiro[6H-furo[3,4-c]pyrazole-4,4'-piperidine]
- 3-[[1-[(4-chlorophenyl)methyl]-4-piperidyl]methyl]-1,3-benzoxazol-2-one: very high affinity and subtype selectivity

Agents exist that have high σ_{1} affinity but either lack subtype selectivity or have high affinity at other binding sites, thus being more or less dirty/multifunctional, like haloperidol. Furthermore, there is a wide range of agents with an at least moderate σ_{1} involvement in their binding profile.

== Clinical significance ==
Mutations in the SIGMAR1 gene have been associated with distal spinal muscular atrophy type 2.

There has been much interest in the sigma-1 receptor and its role in age-related neurodegenerative diseases such as Alzheimer's disease. During healthy ageing, the density of sigma-1 receptors has been seen to increase. However, in diseases such as Alzheimer's disease, there appears to be a reduction in sigma-1 receptor expression. It has been suggested that targeting the sigma-1 receptor along with other receptors could increase neuron survival and function in neurodegenerative disease. The activation of autophagy has also been suggested as a downstream mechanism linked to sigma-1 receptor activation.

=== As a drug target ===
(Sig-1R) has emerged as a promising therapeutic strategy across multiple neurological, psychiatric, and degenerative conditions. The receptor's role as a molecular chaperone at the endoplasmic reticulum (ER)-mitochondria interface and its modulation of calcium signaling, neurotransmitter systems, and cellular stress responses underpin its therapeutic potential.

Sig-1R ligands show efficacy in preclinical models of depression, anxiety, and schizophrenia. Antidepressants like fluvoxamine and Amitriptyline act partly through Sig-1R agonism, enhancing synaptic plasticity and restoring excitatory/inhibitory balance. Clinical trials with selective agonists (e.g., SA4503, pridopidine) have demonstrated mixed results, but the receptor remains a focus for developing fast-acting antidepressants.

In amyotrophic lateral sclerosis (ALS), Sig-1R agonists (PRE-084, SA4503) improve motor function and motoneuron survival in animal models by modulating ER stress and autophagy. Similarly, Sig-1R activation shows neuroprotective effects in Alzheimer's and Parkinson's models, potentially slowing disease progression.

Despite setbacks in clinical trials (e.g., igmesine for depression), the receptor's broad regulatory roles continue to drive drug discovery, with candidates like ANAVEX2-73 and T-817MA in development for cognitive disorders.

== Knockout mice ==
σ_{1} receptor knockout mice were created in 2003 to study the effects of endogenous DMT. Strangely, the mice demonstrated no overt phenotype. As expected, however, they did lack locomotor response to the σ ligand (+)-SKF-10,047 and displayed reduced response to formalin induced pain. Speculation has focused on the ability of other receptors in the σ family (e.g., σ_{2}, with similar binding properties) to compensate for the lack of σ_{1} receptor.

== See also ==
- Sigma-2 receptor
