= Prephytoene-diphosphate synthase =

Prephytoene-diphosphate synthase may refer to:

- All-trans-phytoene synthase, an enzyme
- Phytoene synthase, an enzyme
