= Geranylgeranyl-diphosphate geranylgeranyltransferase =

Geranylgeranyl-diphosphate geranylgeranyltransferase may refer to:

- All-trans-phytoene synthase, an enzyme
- Phytoene synthase, an enzyme
