= PSase =

PSase may refer to:

- All-trans-phytoene synthase, an enzyme
- Phytoene synthase, an enzyme
