= 24-hydroxycholesterol 7alpha-hydroxylase =

Class of enzymes

Identifiers
- EC no.: 1.14.14.26
- CAS no.: 288309-90-0

Databases
- IntEnz: IntEnz view
- BRENDA: BRENDA entry
- ExPASy: NiceZyme view
- KEGG: KEGG entry
- MetaCyc: metabolic pathway
- PRIAM: profile
- PDB structures: RCSB PDB PDBe PDBsum
Search
- PMC: articles
- PubMed: articles
- NCBI: proteins

In enzymology, a 24-hydroxycholesterol 7alpha-hydroxylase (EC 1.14.14.26) is an enzyme that catalyzes the chemical reaction

24S-hydroxycholesterol
+ NADPH
O_{2} + H^{+}
H_{2}O
(24S)-7α,24-dihydroxycholesterol
+ NADP^{+}

The four substrates of this enzyme are 24S-hydroxycholesterol, reduced nicotinamide adenine dinucleotide phosphate (NADPH), oxygen, and a proton. Its products are (24S)-7α,24-dihydroxycholesterol, oxidised NADP^{+}, and water.

This enzyme is a cytochrome P450-type oxidoreductase, acting on paired donors, with molecular oxygen as oxidant and incorporating one of its atoms. The systematic name of this enzyme class is (24R)-cholest-5-ene-3beta,24-diol,NADPH:oxygen oxidoreductase (7alpha-hydroxylating). Other names in common use include 24-hydroxycholesterol 7alpha-monooxygenase, CYP39A1, and CYP39A1 oxysterol 7alpha-hydroxylase.

== See also ==
- Steroidogenic enzyme
