= LXRA =

LXRA may refer to:

- Level Crossing Removal Authority - statutory authority in Victoria, Australia
- Liver X receptor alpha - a nuclear receptor protein in humans
