= Holothurin =

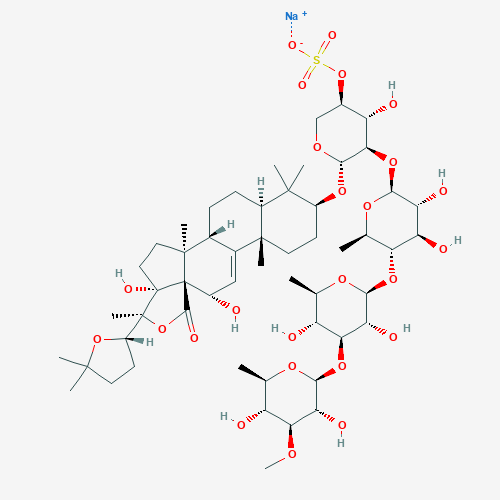

Names
- IUPAC name Sodium;[(3R,4R,5R,6S)-5-[(2S,3R,4R,5S,6R)-5-[(2S,3R,4S,5R,6R)-4-[(2S,3R,4S,5R,6R)-3,5-dihydroxy-4-methoxy-6-methyloxan-2-yl]oxy-3,5-dihydroxy-6-methyloxan-2-yl]oxy-3,4-dihydroxy-6-methyloxan-2-yl]oxy-6-[[(1S,2S,5R,6S,9S,10S,13S,16S,18R)-6-[(2S)-5,5-dimethyloxolan-2-yl]-5,10-dihydroxy-2,6,13,17,17-pentamethyl-8-oxo-7-oxapentacyclo[10.8.0.0^{2,9}.0^{5,9}.0^{13,18}]icos-11-en-16-yl]oxy]-4-hydroxyoxan-3-yl]] sulfate

Identifiers
CAS Number	11029-72-4
3D model (JSmol)	Interactive image
ChemSpider	57262552
PubChem CID	56842186
- InChI: InChI=1S/C54H86O25S.Na/c1-22-32(56)40(68-11)37(61)44(70-22)75-41-33(57)23(2)71-45(38(41)62)74-39-24(3)72-43(36(60)35(39)59)76-42-34(58)27(79-80(65,66)67)21-69-46(42)73-30-15-17-50(8)26-20-29(55)54-47(63)78-52(10,31-14-16-48(4,5)77-31)53(54,64)19-18-51(54,9)25(26)12-13-28(50)49(30,6)7;/h20,22-25,27-46,55-62,64H,12-19,21H2,1-11H3,(H,65,66,67);/q;+1/p-1/t22-,23-,24-,25-,27-,28+,29+,30+,31+,32-,33-,34+,35-,36-,37-,38-,39-,40+,41+,42-,43+,44+,45+,46+,50-,51+,52+,53+,54-;/m1./s1 Key: MAWWITJOQDJRJF-ADBICINLSA-M
- SMILES: C[C@@H]1[C@H]([C@@H]([C@H]([C@@H](O1)O[C@H]2[C@@H]([C@H](O[C@H]([C@@H]2O)O[C@@H]3[C@H](O[C@H]([C@@H]([C@H]3O)O)O[C@@H]4[C@H]([C@@H](CO[C@H]4O[C@H]5CC[C@]6([C@H](C5(C)C)CC[C@@H]7C6=C[C@@H]([C@@]89[C@]7(CC[C@@]8([C@](OC9=O)(C)[C@@H]1CCC(O1)(C)C)O)C)O)C)OS(=O)(=O)[O-])O)C)C)O)O)OC)O.[Na+]

Properties
Chemical formula	C_{54}H_{85}NaO_{25}S
Molar mass	1189.3 g/mol
- Except where otherwise noted, data are given for materials in their standard state (at 25 °C [77 °F], 100 kPa). Infobox references

Holothurin A

Names
- IUPAC name Sodium;[(3R,4R,5R,6S)-5-[(2S,3R,4R,5S,6R)-5-[(2S,3R,4S,5R,6R)-4-[(2S,3R,4S,5R,6R)-3,5-dihydroxy-6-(hydroxymethyl)-4-methoxyoxan-2-yl]oxy-3,5-dihydroxy-6-(hydroxymethyl)oxan-2-yl]oxy-3,4-dihydroxy-6-methyloxan-2-yl]oxy-6-[[(1S,2S,5R,6S,9R,10S,13S,16S,18R)-6-(5,5-dimethyloxolan-2-yl)-5,10-dihydroxy-2,6,13,17,17-pentamethyl-8-oxo-7-oxapentacyclo[10.8.0.0^{2,9}.0^{5,9}.0^{13,18}]icos-11-en-16-yl]oxy]-4-hydroxyoxan-3-yl]] sulfate

Identifiers
CAS Number	38-26-6
3D model (JSmol)	Interactive image
ChemSpider	16738001
PubChem CID	44559168
- InChI: InChI=1S/C54H86O27S.Na/c1-22-39(76-45-38(64)41(33(59)26(20-56)74-45)77-44-37(63)40(70-9)32(58)25(19-55)73-44)35(61)36(62)43(72-22)78-42-34(60)27(81-82(67,68)69)21-71-46(42)75-30-13-15-50(6)24-18-29(57)54-47(65)80-52(8,31-12-14-48(2,3)79-31)53(54,66)17-16-51(54,7)23(24)10-11-28(50)49(30,4)5;/h18,22-23,25-46,55-64,66H,10-17,19-21H2,1-9H3,(H,67,68,69);/q;+1/p-1/t22-,23-,25-,26-,27-,28+,29+,30+,31?,32-,33-,34+,35-,36-,37-,38-,39-,40+,41+,42-,43+,44+,45+,46+,50-,51+,52+,53+,54+;/m1./s1 Key: KXDQPKMJSMCBEY-AEATXNOCSA-M
- SMILES: C[C@@H]1[C@H]([C@@H]([C@H]([C@@H](O1)O[C@@H]2[C@H]([C@@H](CO[C@H]2O[C@H]3CC[C@]4([C@H](C3(C)C)CC[C@@H]5C4=C[C@@H]([C@]67[C@]5(CC[C@@]6([C@](OC7=O)(C)C8CCC(O8)(C)C)O)C)O)C)OS(=O)(=O)[O-])O)O)O)O[C@H]9[C@@H]([C@H]([C@@H]([C@H](O9)CO)O)O[C@H]1[C@@H]([C@H]([C@@H]([C@H](O1)CO)O)OC)O)O.[Na+]

Properties
Chemical formula	C_{54}H_{85}NaO_{27}S
Molar mass	1221.3 g/mol
- Except where otherwise noted, data are given for materials in their standard state (at 25 °C [77 °F], 100 kPa). Infobox references

Holothurin B

Names
- IUPAC name Sodium;[(3R,4R,5R,6S)-6-[[(5R,6R,10S,13S,16S)-6-[(2S)-5,5-dimethyloxolan-2-yl]-5,10-dihydroxy-2,6,13,17,17-pentamethyl-8-oxo-7-oxapentacyclo[10.8.0.0^{2,9}.0^{5,9}.0^{13,18}]icos-11-en-16-yl]oxy]-4-hydroxy-5-[(2S,3R,4S,5S,6R)-3,4,5-trihydroxy-6-methyloxan-2-yl]oxyoxan-3-yl]] sulfate

Identifiers
CAS Number	11052-32-7
3D model (JSmol)	Interactive image
ChemSpider	16738002
PubChem CID	23674754
- InChI: InChI=1S/C41H64O17S.Na/c1-19-27(43)29(45)30(46)32(53-19)55-31-28(44)22(58-59(49,50)51)18-52-33(31)54-25-12-14-37(6)21-17-24(42)41-34(47)57-39(8,26-11-13-35(2,3)56-26)40(41,48)16-15-38(41,7)20(21)9-10-23(37)36(25,4)5;/h17,19-20,22-33,42-46,48H,9-16,18H2,1-8H3,(H,49,50,51);/q;+1/p-1/t19-,20?,22-,23?,24+,25+,26+,27-,28+,29+,30-,31-,32+,33+,37-,38?,39-,40+,41?;/m1./s1 Key: XPKZSKANINADOD-ZSNWYRGCSA-M
- SMILES: C[C@@H]1[C@H]([C@@H]([C@H]([C@@H](O1)O[C@@H]2[C@H]([C@@H](CO[C@H]2O[C@H]3CC[C@]4(C(C3(C)C)CCC5C4=C[C@@H](C67C5(CC[C@@]6([C@@](OC7=O)(C)[C@@H]8CCC(O8)(C)C)O)C)O)C)OS(=O)(=O)[O-])O)O)O)O.[Na+]

Properties
Chemical formula	C_{41}H_{63}NaO_{17}S
Molar mass	883 g/mol
- Except where otherwise noted, data are given for materials in their standard state (at 25 °C [77 °F], 100 kPa). Infobox references

The holothurins are a group of toxins originally isolated from the sea cucumber Actinopyga agassizii. They are contained within clusters of sticky threads called Cuvierian tubules which are expelled from the sea cucumber as a mode of self-defence. The holothurins belong to the class of compounds known as saponins and are anionic surfactants which can cause red blood cells to rupture. The holothurins can be toxic to humans if ingested in high amounts.

== Pharmacology ==
=== Effects on nerves ===
Holothurin is shown to have a blocking effect on nerves in desheathed bullfrog sciatic nerve and rat phrenic nerve preparations, and its potency can be compared to that of cocaine, procaine, and physostigmine. Unlike the other mentioned blocking agents, the disrupting effect of holothurin appears to be quite irreversible upon washing.

In another experiment on frog sciatic nerve, holothurin A is shown to be capable of destroying electrical excitability of a node of Ranvier along with basophilic macromolecular material found in and near the cytoplasm of the node. In another experiment on rat phrenic nerve, the nerve-disrupting effect of holothurin A is found to be preventable when specific concentrations of physostigmine are present.

=== Other effects ===
Holothurin A and holothurin A1, along with other sea cucumber saponins, are found to reduce weight gain in mice. They improve glucose tolerance, reduce levels of lipids in blood and liver, and inhibit the absorption of lipids in the intestine. They also inhibit the activity of pancreatic lipase, decrease the growth of white adipocytes, a factor which contributes to obesity, and stimulate the production of LXR-β nuclear receptor and ABCA1 protein. These findings suggest a possibility of the holothurins and other sea cucumber saponins being used in the development of anti-obesity drug.

The holothurins are shown to have anti-melanogenic and anti-wrinkling effects on human skin by inhibiting melanin production in Melan-A cells and promoting collagen production in human dermal fibroblasts via the ERK pathway.
