= Herman O. Sintim =

Ghanaian–American chemist

- Education: University College London (B.Sc.); University of Oxford (D.Phil.)
- Known for: Chemical probes of cyclic dinucleotide signaling; kinase inhibitors
- Awards: Camille Dreyfus Teacher-Scholar Award (2011)
- Scientific career
- Fields: Chemical biology, medicinal chemistry, organic chemistry
- Workplaces: University of Notre Dame; Purdue University; University of Maryland, College Park; Stanford University

Herman O. Sintim is a Ghanaian–American chemist. Since January 2025 he has been the Grace-Rupley Professor of Chemical Biology at the University of Notre Dame and associate director of its Harper Cancer Research Institute. Before that he was at Purdue University from 2015 to 2024, where he was named a Distinguished Professor in 2023.

His research in chemical biology and medicinal chemistry concerns small molecules that interfere with cell signaling. One line of work concerns cyclic di-GMP and related cyclic dinucleotides, messengers that bacteria use to control biofilm formation and virulence. To study this signaling, his group has developed chemical probes and assays, including cyclic di-GMP analogs biased toward one molecular shape, a selective inhibitor of the bacterial enzyme RocR, and a rapid assay for detecting molecules bound to proteins. A second line of work concerns protein kinase inhibitors for drug-resistant cancers.

== Early life and education ==
Sintim is from Ghana and is a naturalized United States citizen. He studied medicinal chemistry at University College London, graduating with a B.Sc. in 1999, and completed a D.Phil. in organic chemistry at the University of Oxford in 2002. His doctoral work, supervised by David Hodgson, was on the total synthesis of the zaragozic acids. He then did postdoctoral research at Oxford with Tim Donohoe and, from 2004 to 2006, at Stanford University with Eric T. Kool.

== Career ==
Sintim joined the University of Maryland, College Park, as an assistant professor of chemistry in 2006 and became a full professor in 2015. He moved to Purdue at the start of the fall 2015 semester, and in October 2015 the university's trustees approved his appointment as Drug Discovery Professor of Chemistry.

He took leave from Purdue between 2020 and 2022 to serve as a program director in the chemistry division of the National Science Foundation. Purdue then named him Richard B. Wetherill Professor of Chemistry and Drug Discovery (2022) and Distinguished Professor (2023). Notre Dame announced his appointment to the Grace-Rupley professorship and the Harper Cancer Research Institute post in November 2024, and he started in January 2025.

== Research ==
=== Bacterial signaling ===
Many bacteria coordinate group behavior through quorum sensing, using signals such as autoinducer-2 (AI-2), which is shared across species. At Maryland, Sintim and William Bentley's group made synthetic AI-2 analogs that alter this signaling. Working with Kyoung-Seok Ryu's group, they then examined how bacteria sense AI-2 and how sensing connects to metabolism. Crystal structures showed how the regulator LsrR binds the signal and two blocking analogs, and how HPr, a protein involved in sugar uptake, binds and inhibits the AI-2 kinase LsrK, linking quorum sensing to sugar metabolism.

A second theme is cyclic di-GMP, a messenger that bacteria make with diguanylate cyclases and break down with phosphodiesterases, and that helps control biofilm formation. Beginning in 2011, his group made analogs of the molecule. According to a 2019 review by Qvortrup and colleagues, changing a single atom biased the analogs toward one three-dimensional shape, and one such analog inhibited phosphodiesterases from Pseudomonas aeruginosa without affecting a cyclase. The review saw this as showing that shape could steer binding toward particular proteins, though not as directly relevant to blocking biofilms.

The same review described a 2016 compound from the group as highly selective for RocR, a virulence-associated P. aeruginosa phosphodiesterase, among five enzymes tested, and as the first example of a cell-permeable inhibitor that selectively inhibits one type of phosphodiesterase.

The group later studied related messengers that can trigger immune responses through STING; a 2022 review listed its 2021 inhibitor of a Mycobacterium tuberculosis cyclic dinucleotide phosphodiesterase among compounds identified against that enzyme.

The group also made fluorescent sensors for cyclic di-GMP. With Vincent Lee's group it also developed the differential radial capillary action of ligand assay (DRaCALA), a simple test of whether a small molecule binds a protein: on nitrocellulose paper, proteins and anything bound to them stay where the drop is spotted, while free molecules spread outward. A 2016 review by Martina Valentini and Alain Filloux noted that DRaCALA is used to screen libraries of proteins for cyclic di-GMP binding.

=== Kinase inhibitors ===
His group also designs inhibitors of protein kinases involved in resistance to cancer drugs. One, HSN748, is a nicotinamide analog of the leukemia drug ponatinib. A 2025 review compared it with ponatinib in laboratory kinase tests, noting its activity against mutant forms of FLT3, a kinase mutated in acute myeloid leukemia. In 2024, his group and collaborators at the Indiana University School of Medicine reported preclinical studies of the compound, and according to a Purdue press release it was licensed to KinaRx, a company Sintim co-founded.
