= Oxysterol =

Derivative of cholesterol obtained by oxidation

An oxysterol is a derivative of cholesterol obtained by oxidation involving enzymes and / or pro-oxidants. Such compounds play important roles in various biological processes such as cholesterol homeostasis, lipid metabolism (sphingolipids, fatty acids), apoptosis, autophagy, and prenylation of proteins; the mode of action of oxysterols in these effects is still poorly understood. Several oxysterols are associated with age-related diseases such as cardiovascular disease, eye disease (cataract, age-related macular degeneration), certain neurodegenerative diseases and cancers. Identifying therapies to regulate the body's production of oxysterols and their biological activities is of therapeutic interest.

A wider definition could encompass oxidized phytosterols, which are also sterols. The term "oxyphytosterols" may be used for distinction.

== Measurement ==
They are measured from samples using gas chromatography–mass spectrometry (GC-MS) or LC-MS/MS.

== Sources ==
They are produced in the body as key metabolic signals. Some like 7-ketocholesterol (7-KC / 7O-C) are found in food.

== Types ==
An oxysterol can be differentiated from others by where the oxidation had occurred. One can be oxidized in the sidechain, in the rings, or both. In terms of nomenclature, oxidation mostly happen by replacement of a hydrogen with a hydroxy group. A doubly-oxidized oxysterol, both on the ring (position 7α) and the sidechain (position 25), is called a 7α,25-dihydroxycholesterol (7α,25-diHC). Another possibility is the formation of a ketone group, like in (25R)26-Hydroxy-7-oxocholesterol (26H,7O-C) aka 7-keto-27-hydroxycholesterol.

== Biological activities ==
Side-chain oxysterols activate the liver X receptor (LXR), inhibit SREBP-2 maturation, and modulate NMDA receptors. One downstream effect of LXR activation is increased CYP7A1 activity, which produces 7α-HC as a precursor to bile acids. This would accelerate the excretion of cholesterols from the liver. Another effect is increased cholesterol efflux from macrophages; given sufficient reverse cholesterol transport capacity this would help eliminate atherosclerosis plaques.

7α,25-diHC and 7α,26-diHC bind to EBI2 and guide the migration of EBI2-expressing immune cells.

26H,7O-C, 7β,26-diHC, and 20S-HC bind to Smoothened, which is a key part of hedgehog signaling.

== Disease relevance ==
=== Cardiovascular and metabolic disorders ===
Oxysterols initially received attention because consumption in diet appeared to be positively associated with atherosclerosis progression and other cardiovascular diseases. The initial hypothesis is that, much like oxidized LDL, oxysterols could be pro-oxidative and pro-inflammatory. Oxysterols can be generated during food processing, especially in processes that involve intensive heat and exposure to oxygen like deep frying.

The difficulty with the oxysterol theory is that experimental results have been far from consistent. Although they show negative effects such as inhibition of CYP7A1 and toxicity to heart cells in vitro, animal-feeding studies have produced a mixture of pro- and anti-atherogenic effects (not to mention the occasional lack of effect). These mixed results has continued to exist as of 2014. Dietary oxysterols cause "surprisingly small changes in cholesterol turnover and homeostasis" of rodents.

In addition, the sugar cyclodextrin (CD) reverses atherosclerosis in mice fed a high-fat diet. CD is absorbed into the mouse bloodstream. It increases the production of oxysterols in macrophages and plaques, which causes the activation of LXR in macrophages. This in turn causes the macrophages more capable of cholesterol efflux and makes them more anti-inflammatory. The study implies that oxysterols do not play a strictly detrimental role.

=== Nervous system ===
Amyotrophic lateral sclerosis is associated with decreased action of CYP27A1, which can be detected by reduced amounts of the kinds of oxysterols (26-HC and 3β-HCA) produced by the enzyme in the blood. Hereditary spastic paraplegia type 5 (SPG5), resulting from a CYP7B1 deficiency, causes a similar reduction, though applying to both free and esterified forms of these sterols. Cerebrotendinous xanthomatosis (CTX) involves a CYP27A1 deficiency. Both SPG5 and CTX have similar symptoms and are associated with a reduction of 3β,7α-diHCA. This can be part of the diseases' pathophysiology, since 3β,7α-diHCA protects oculomotor neurons through activating LXR. Another inborn error of cholesterol deficiency, ACOX2, also presents with ataxia.

Huntington's disease is associated with lowered cholesterol and 24-HC. 24-HC is made by CYP46A1.

Parkinson's disease is associated with elevated 24-HC in the cerebrospinal fluid (CSF), but lowered 24-HC in the blood serum. This might mean that fewer neurons are metabolically active.

Alzheimer's disease is associated with elevated 24-HC in CSF and lowered 24-HC in blood serum. 26-HC is elevated both in CSF and serum. In AD, CYP46A1 shows ectopic expression in astrocytes. It's thought that CYP46A1/24-HC is reflective of a protective mechanism against oxidative damage while CYP27A1/26-HC can contribute to AD.

=== Cancer ===
Given the signaling pathways that oxysterols are produced and consumed in, its not surprising that they play a role in cancer. 25-HC and 26-HC have been linked to the aetiology of breast cancer. 26-HC in particular is also linked to metastasis. 7α,26-diHC and 7β,26-diHC likely also play a role in the formation of γδ-T cells.

== Example ==
- Oxycholesterol (5,6-epoxycholesterol)
- 24S-Hydroxycholesterol (24S-HC)
- 27-Hydroxycholesterol (27-HC)
