= Cholesterol 24-hydroxylase =

Protein family

CYP46A1
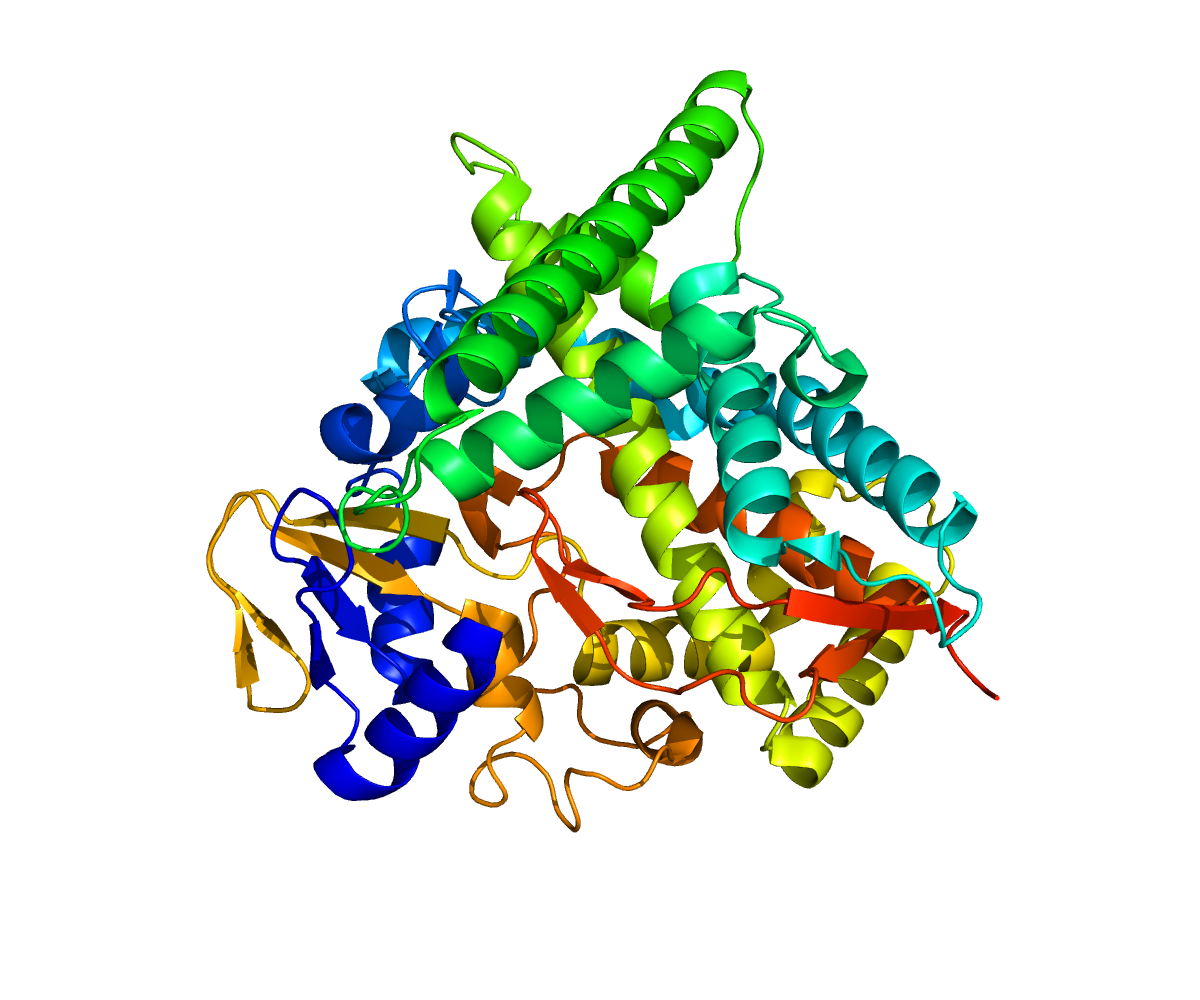

Identifiers
- Aliases: CYP46A1, CP46, CYP46, cytochrome P450 family 46 subfamily A member 1
- External IDs: OMIM: 604087; MGI: 1341877; GeneCards: CYP46A1
Available structures
PDB	Ortholog search: PDBe RCSB
PDB	List of PDB id codes 4FIA, 2Q9F, 3MDV, 4J14, 4ENH, 2Q9G, 3MDM, 3MDT, 3MDR
Enzyme activity
EC #	BRENDA	ExPASy	KEGG	MetaCyc
1.14.14.25	↗	↗	↗	↗

Gene location (Human)
Chr.	Chromosome 14 (human)
Band	14q32.2	Start	99,684,298 bp
Band	14q32.2	End	99,727,301 bp

Gene location (Mouse)
Chr.	Chromosome 12 (mouse)
Band	12|12 F1	Start	108,300,640 bp
Band	12|12 F1	End	108,328,493 bp
RNA expression pattern
Bgee	Human / Mouse (ortholog); Top expressed in: middle temporal gyrus; putamen; Brodmann area 46; caudate nucleus; Region I of hippocampus proper; nucleus accumbens; Brodmann area 23; entorhinal cortex; superior frontal gyrus; orbitofrontal cortex / Top expressed in: visual cortex; superior frontal gyrus; primary visual cortex; olfactory tubercle; piriform cortex; medial dorsal nucleus; prefrontal cortex; subiculum; lateral geniculate nucleus; dentate gyrus of hippocampal formation granule cell; More reference expression data
BioGPS	More reference expression data
Gene ontology
Molecular function	iron ion binding; metal ion binding; monooxygenase activity; steroid hydroxylase activity; heme binding; oxidoreductase activity, acting on paired donors, with incorporation or reduction of molecular oxygen; oxidoreductase activity; cholesterol 24-hydroxylase activity
Cellular component	organelle membrane; integral component of membrane; endoplasmic reticulum membrane; membrane; intracellular membrane-bounded organelle; endoplasmic reticulum; dendrite; presynapse; postsynapse; cell junction; cell projection; synapse
Biological process	steroid metabolic process; lipid metabolism; cholesterol metabolic process; cholesterol catabolic process; nervous system development; sterol metabolic process; bile acid biosynthetic process; xenobiotic metabolic process; progesterone metabolic process; regulation of long-term synaptic potentiation; C21-steroid hormone metabolic process
Sources:Amigo / QuickGO
Orthologs
Databases	NCBI: entry; OMA: entry
Species	Human	Mouse
Entrez	10858	13116
Ensembl	ENSG00000036530	ENSMUSG00000021259
UniProt	Q9Y6A2	Q9WVK8
RefSeq (mRNA)	NM_006668	NM_010010
RefSeq (protein)	NP_006659	NP_034140
Location (UCSC)	Chr 14: 99.68 – 99.73 Mb	Chr 12: 108.3 – 108.33 Mb
PubMed search
- Wikidata
View/Edit Human	View/Edit Mouse

Cholesterol 24-hydroxylase
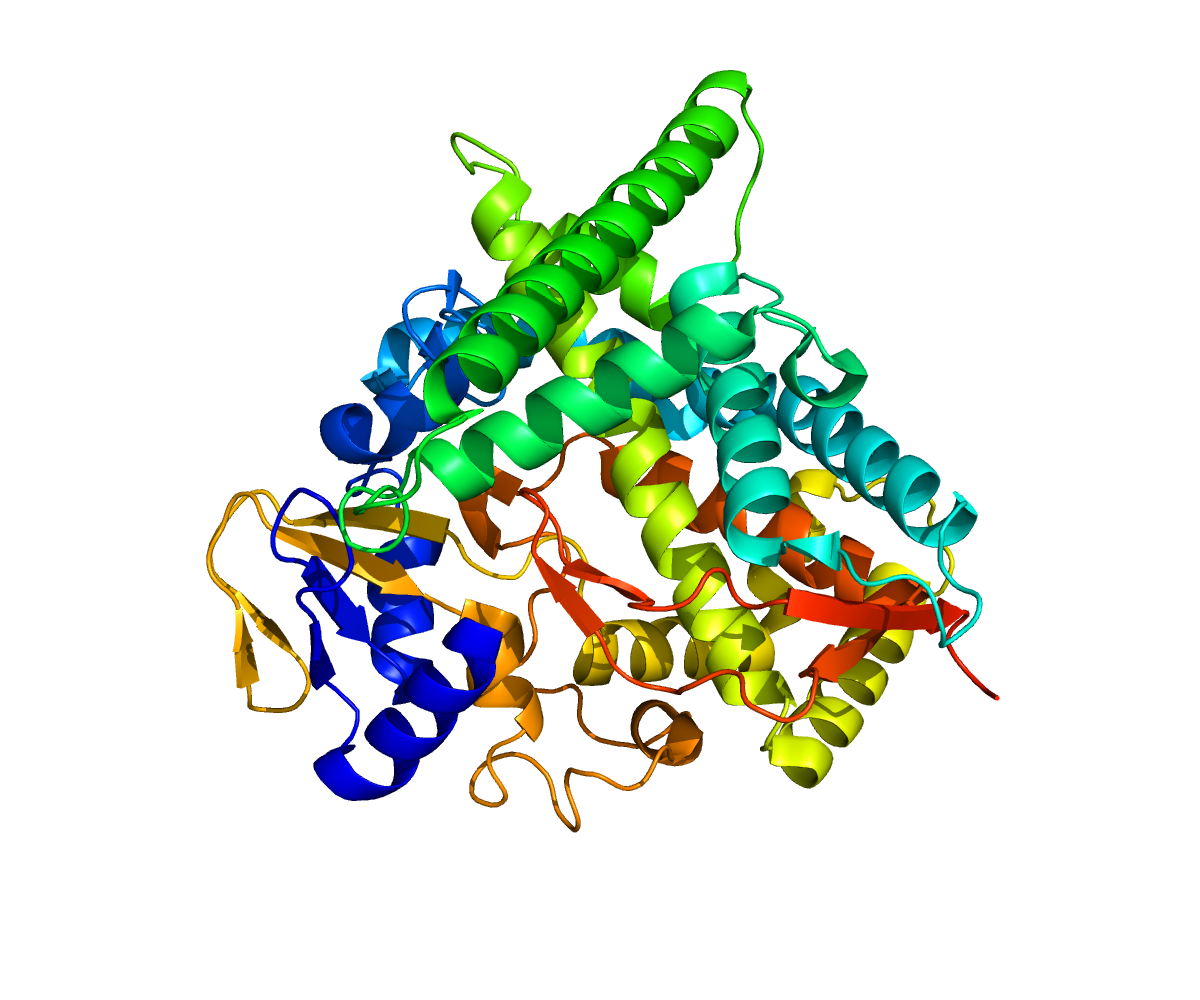
- Structure of cholesterol 24-hydroxylase (CYP46A1) in Homo sapiens. Based on PyMOL rendering of PDB 2Q9F.

Identifiers
- EC no.: 1.14.14.25

Databases
- BRENDA: enzyme data
- ExPASy: NiceZyme view
- KEGG: enzyme entry
- MetaCyc: metabolic pathway
- Rhea: reactions
- PDB structures: RCSB PDB PDBe PDBsum
Search
- PMC: articles
- PubMed: articles
- NCBI: proteins

Cholesterol 24-hydroxylase (EC 1.14.14.25), also commonly known as cholesterol 24S-hydroxylase, cholesterol 24-monooxygenase, CYP46, or CYP46A1, is an enzyme that catalyzes the conversion of cholesterol to 24S-hydroxycholesterol. It is responsible for the majority of cholesterol turnover in the human central nervous system. The systematic name of this enzyme class is cholesterol,NADPH:oxygen oxidoreductase (24-hydroxylating).

This enzyme is a member of the cytochrome P450 (CYP) superfamily of enzymes. Like many other CYP enzymes that act on cholesterol, cholesterol-24 hydroxylase is a monooxygenase that hydroxylates the side-chain of cholesterol.

Because 24S-hydroxycholesterol is more polar than cholesterol, it can more easily pass the blood–brain barrier to exit the brain and pass into the bloodstream, where it can then travel to the liver to be further degraded. This enzyme has also been found at low quantities in the retina, where it performs the same function to a lesser degree.

Genetic cloning of the encoding gene (CYP46A1) was first accomplished in 1999 and an extensive E. coli expression and purification system was later developed in 2003.

== Molecular structure ==
The enzymatic structure of the human cholesterol-24 hydroxylase was determined via crystallography at the Stanford Synchrotron Radiation Lightsource, and was shown to be a 57kDa (500 residue) monomeric heme-containing protein bound to the endoplasmic reticulum in neurons.

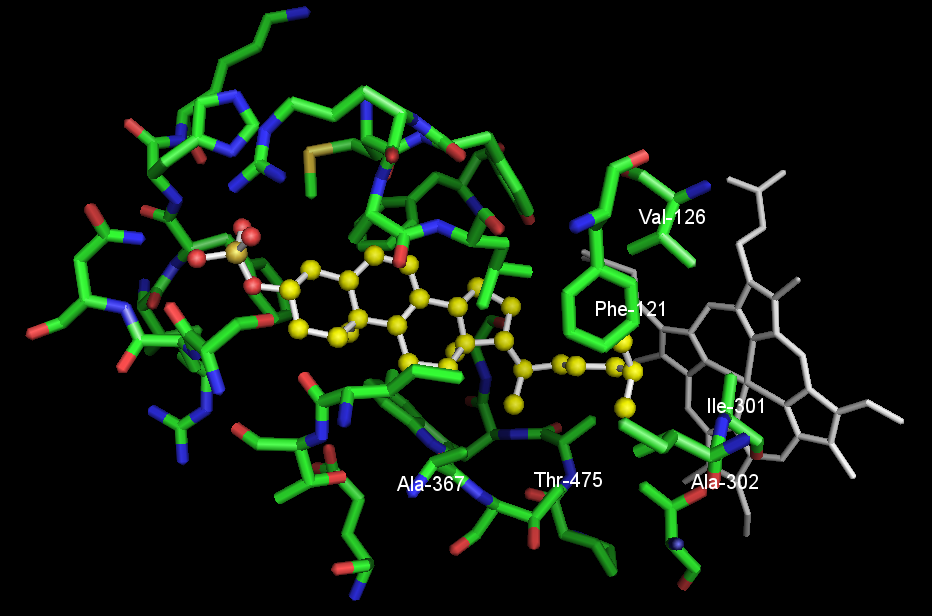
Cholesterol-24 hydroxylase active site and heme molecule with bound cholesterol 3-sulfate. Hydrophobic residues interacting with the aliphatic tail of the cholesterol are labelled in white. Created in pyMOL from PDB 2Q9F

Cholesterol-24 hydroxylase is similar in structure to many other cytochrome P450s, possessing, for example, the conserved stretch of 23 hydrophobic residues in the N-terminus that make up a transmembrane-anchoring domain (residues 3-27).

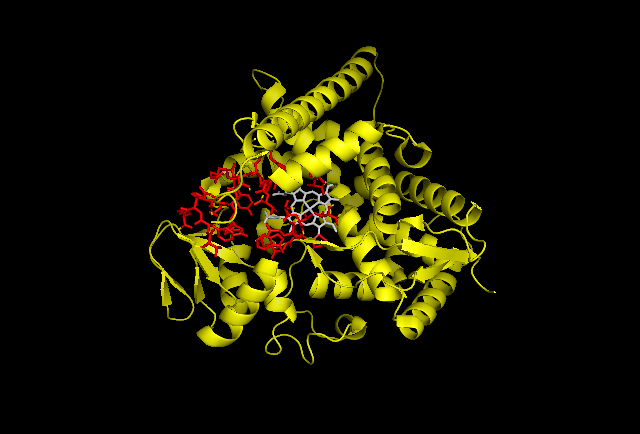
Cholester-24 hydroxylase (CYP46A1) with placement of active site shown in red. created in pyMOL from PDB 2Q9F.

Even so, the cholesterol-24 hydroxylase C-terminus has a unique proline-rich region of 5 repeated proline residues, a structural motif absent in all other related cytochrome p450 enzymes. While the exact function of these proline residues remain highly speculative, it has been shown that the deletion of this region results in a two-fold decrease in the enzyme’s catalytic efficiency.

Binding of cholesterol results in an enzymatic conformational change and a subsequent induced fit of the active site around the cholesterol molecule, anchoring the hydroxylation site (C-24, C-25) near the catalytic center of the enzyme (5.7Å from the iron core of the heme molecule to allow oxyferryl intermediates to perform the cholesterol hydroxylation). A loop region, known as the B'-C loop, has a series of 5 residues (residues 116-120) unique to cholesterol-24 hydroxylase that contribute to the positioning of the cholesterol molecule within the active site. A single cholesterol molecule takes up the entirety of the active site, with the aliphatic tail of the cholesterol held in place by interactions with the following hydrophobic residues: Phe-121, Val-126, Ile-301, Ala-302, Ala-367, Thr-475. The active site is accessed via a single entrance created by two helices (B' and F) and the β1-sheet.

There are no known allosteric regulatory sites.

== Enzyme mechanism ==
Cholesterol-24 hydroxylase catalyzes the following reaction:

cholesterol
+ NADPH
O_{2} + H^{+}
H_{2}O
24S-hydroxycholesterol
+ NADP^{+}

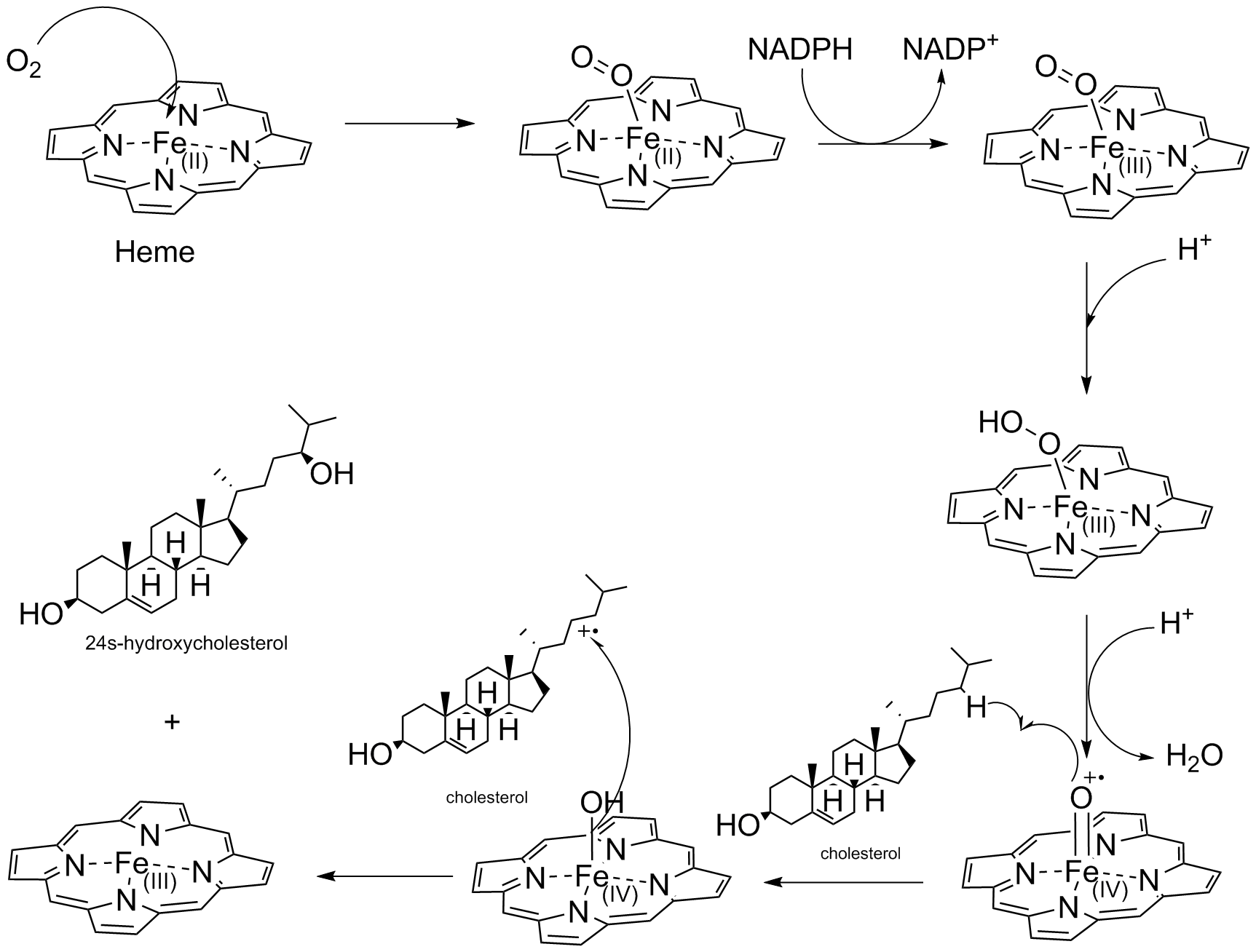
Cholesterol-24 hydroxylase mechanism. The heme molecule forms an oxyferryl intermediate that abstracts a hydrogen from cholesterol. The subsequent alkyl intermediate then reacts with the activated oxygen to form the final product.

The four substrates of this enzyme are cholesterol, a hemoprotein-bound nicotinamide adenine dinucleotide phosphate (NADPH), oxygen, and a proton. Its products are 24S-hydroxycholesterol, oxidised NADP^{+}, and water.

Like all other cytochrome P450s, cholesterol-24 hydroxylase utilizes an oxyferryl intermediate to hydroxylate cholesterol. The oxyferryl radical takes the hydrogen from carbon-24 to create an alkyl radical intermediate. The cholesterol alkyl radical then combines with the activated oxygen on the heme to create 24S-hydroxycholesterol.

== Function ==
Cholesterol-24 hydroxylase contributes to brain cholesterol homeostasis by hydroxylating cholesterol at carbon-24 to 24S-hydroxycholesterol to allow for elimination of cholesterol from the brain to the liver. Only around 6–7 mg of cholesterol, however, are hydroxylated by this enzyme on a daily basis, suggesting the existence of alternative functions – presently unknown. In vitro experiments have shown that it is also capable of further metabolizing 24S-hydroxycholesterol into 24,25- and 24,27-dihydroxycholesterols.

Cholesterol-24 hydroxylase has a variety of possible substrates, including: elongated steroid chains, cholesterol derivatives, and a variety of drug candidates. As such, it is also likely that it plays a role in lipid metabolism in the brain beyond cholesterol breakdown. Because 24S-hydroxycholesterol (main product of this enzyme) is a major activator of oxysterol liver X receptors (LXR), it is possible that cholesterol-24 hydroxylase may play an indirect regulatory role in the metabolism of lipids in the liver. 24S-hydroxycholesterol also regulates the rate of cholesterol synthesis in the brain, with high levels of 24S-hydroxycholesterol shown to reduce mRNA levels of the following cholesterol synthesis enzymes: HMG CoA reductase, squalene synthase, and FPP synthase.

== Clinical significance ==
Variable expression of cholesterol-24 hydroxylase has been linked to the onset of Alzheimer's disease (AD) in humans. Studies have shown that in AD patients, there is significant decreased expression of cholesterol-24 hydroxylase in neurons. As a result, there is a marked increase of cholesterol in the brain tissue, consistent with the trend observed in AD patients.

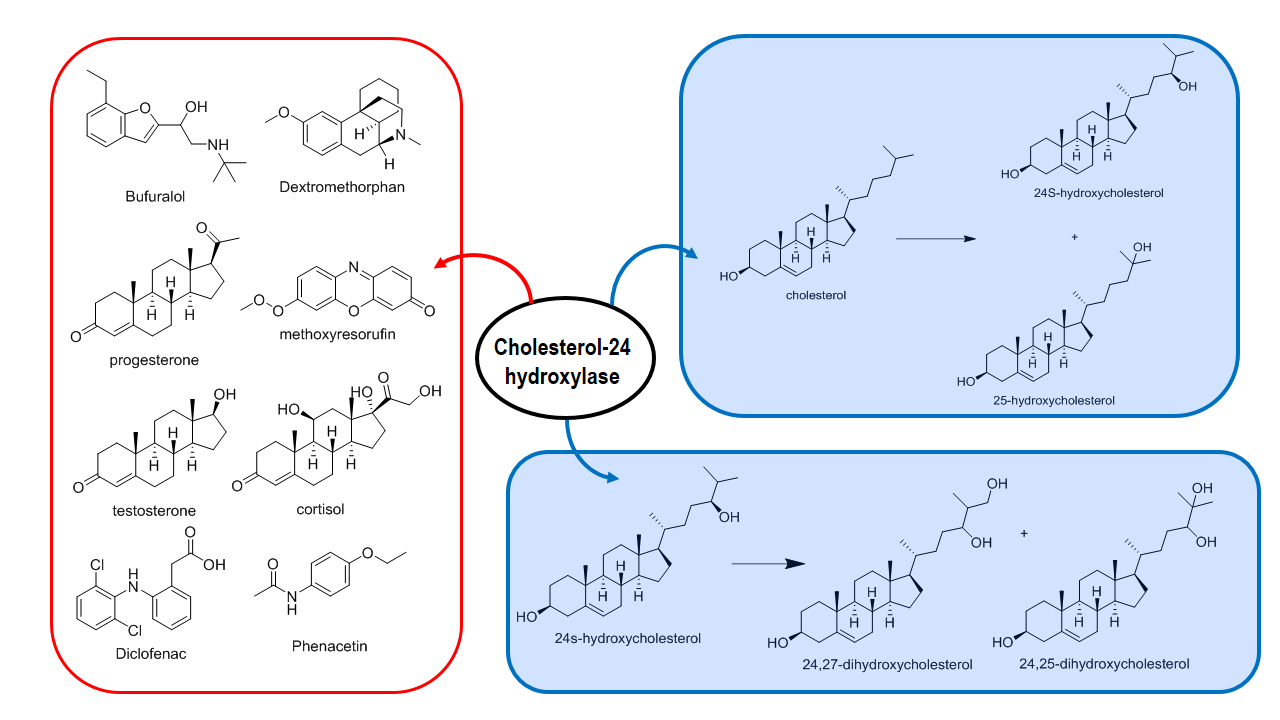
Substrates metabolized by cholesterol-24 hydroxylase. The red box contains a list of xenobiotics the enzyme can metabolize. The reactions in blue are commonly observed in the brain as part of maintaining cholesterol homeostasis.

Neuron degradation in AD has often been attributed to the imbalance in cholesterol homeostasis, and many scientists hypothesize that the lowered expression of cholesterol-24 hydroxylase may be the main cause of this imbalance.

On the other hand, while there is decreased expression in the neurons, there is a contrasting increase of expression in the AD patients' astrocytes, where there is a consequent build-up of the product, 24S-hydroxycholesterol. Recent studies have shown that the increased levels of 24S-hydroxycholesterol in astrocytes may lead to a loss of glial glutamate transporters (EAAT2) and the consequent loss of the glutamate uptake function in the brain, another common symptom observed in AD patients.

Still, the link between expression levels of cholesterol-24 hydroxylase and Alzheimer's Disease remain disputable. While some studies have shown that polymorphisms in the encoding gene for cholesterol-24 hydroxylase have an established positive correlation with AD onset, other publications did not find such an association. Increased expression of cholesterol-24 hydroxylase has also been observed in patients of traumatic brain injury, leading to decreased levels of cholesterol in the plasma membrane. This is hypothesized to be the brain’s typical response to injury.

Cholesterol-24 hydroxylase is easily inhibited by many drugs due to its broad substrate specificity. It has been shown to metabolize bufuralol, progesterone, dextromethorphan, methoxyresorufin, cortisol, diclofenac, phenacetin, and testosterone. The ability for inhibition by various xenobiotics makes this enzyme a prime candidate for drug therapy for AD or other brain injuries.
