= 24S-Hydroxycholesterol =

Names
- IUPAC name (24S)-Cholest-5-ene-3β,24-diol
- Systematic IUPAC name (1R,3aS,3bS,7S,9aR,9bS,11aR)-1-[(2R,5S)-5-Hydroxy-6-methylheptan-2-yl]-9a,11a-dimethyl-2,3,3a,3b,4,6,7,8,9,9a,9b,10,11,11a-tetradecahydro-1H-cyclopenta[a]phenanthren-7-ol
- Other names cerebrosterol

Identifiers
| CAS Number | 474-73-7 |
| 3D model (JSmol) | Interactive image |
| Beilstein Reference | 3218472 |
| ChEBI | CHEBI:34310 |
| ChEMBL | ChEMBL171804 |
| ChemSpider | 108790 |
| KEGG | C13550 |
| PubChem CID | 121948 |
| UNII | 47IMW63S3F |
| CompTox Dashboard (EPA) | DTXSID101313419 |
- InChI: InChI=1S/C27H46O2/c1-17(2)25(29)11-6-18(3)22-9-10-23-21-8-7-19-16-20(28)12-14-26(19,4)24(21)13-15-27(22,23)5/h7,17-18,20-25,28-29H,6,8-16H2,1-5H3/t18-,20+,21+,22-,23+,24+,25+,26+,27-/m1/s1 Key: IOWMKBFJCNLRTC-XWXSNNQWSA-N
- SMILES: C[C@H](CC[C@@H](C(C)C)O)[C@H]1CC[C@@H]2[C@@]1(CC[C@H]3[C@H]2CC=C4[C@@]3(CC[C@@H](C4)O)C)C

Properties
| Chemical formula | C_{27}H_{46}O_{2} |
| Molar mass | 402.663 g·mol^{−1} |
- Except where otherwise noted, data are given for materials in their standard state (at 25 °C [77 °F], 100 kPa). Infobox references

24S-Hydroxycholesterol (24S-HC), also known as cholest-5-ene-3,24-diol or cerebrosterol, is an endogenous oxysterol produced by neurons in the brain to maintain cholesterol homeostasis. It was discovered in 1953 by Alberto Ercoli, S. Di Frisco, and Pietro de Ruggieri, who first isolated the molecule in the horse brain and then demonstrated its presence in the human brain.

== Structure ==
24S-HC is produced by a hydroxy group substitution at carbon number 24 in cholesterol, catalyzed by the enzyme cholesterol 24-hydroxylase (CYP46A1).

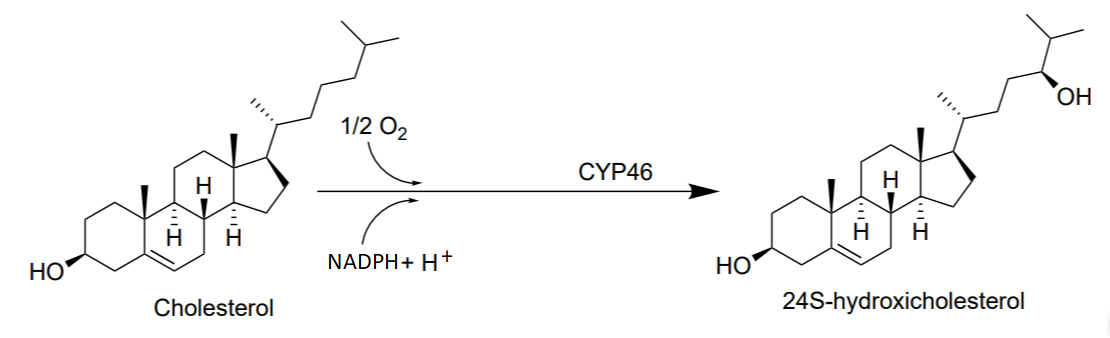
Production of 24S-hydroxycholesterol from cholesterol, as catalyzed by CYP46A1.

== Function ==
24S-HC binds to apolipoproteins such as apoE, apoJ, and apoA1 to form HDL-like complexes which can cross the blood–brain barrier more easily than free cholesterol. Thus, 24S-HC production serves as one of several counterbalancing mechanisms for cholesterol synthesis in the brain. After entering general blood circulation and traveling to the liver, 24S-HC can be sulfated, glucuronidated, or converted into bile acids, which can ultimately be excreted.

24S-HC is an agonist of liver X receptors, a class of nuclear receptors that sense oxysterols. In the brain, liver X receptor beta is the primary LXR type, which interacts with 24S-HC. 24S-HC levels sensed by LXRs can regulate the expression of SREBP mRNA and protein, which in turn regulate cholesterol synthesis and fatty acid synthesis.

24S-HC may participate in several aspects of brain development and function, such as axon and dendrite growth or synaptogenesis, as well as acting as a positive allosteric modulator of NMDA receptors. Regulation of 24S-HC metabolism in neurons may play a role in their health and function, as well as their response to injury or disease. Blood plasma levels of 24S-HC may be altered after acute brain injuries such as stroke or in neurodegenerative diseases such as Alzheimer's disease, Huntington's disease, and multiple sclerosis.
