= Lapaquistat =

Chemical compound

Clinical data
- ATC code: none

Identifiers
- IUPAC name: (1-{[(3R,5S)-7-chloro-5-(2,3-dimethoxyphenyl)-1-(3-hydroxy-2,2-dimethylpropyl)-2-oxo-1,2,3,5-tetrahydro-4,1-benzoxazepin-3-yl]acetyl}piperidin-4-yl)acetic acid
- CAS Number: 189059-71-0
- PubChem CID: 9960389
- DrugBank: DB16215
- ChemSpider: 8135996
- UNII: PEZ79BV72X
- ChEMBL: ChEMBL341976
- CompTox Dashboard (EPA): DTXSID80172294

Chemical and physical data
- Formula: C_{31}H_{39}ClN_{2}O_{8}
- Molar mass: 603.11 g·mol^{−1}
- 3D model (JSmol): Interactive image
- SMILES: O=C(O)CC4CCN(C(=O)C[C@H]1O[C@@H](c2cc(Cl)ccc2N(C1=O)CC(C)(C)CO)c3cccc(OC)c3OC)CC4
- InChI: InChI=1S/C31H39ClN2O8/c1-31(2,18-35)17-34-23-9-8-20(32)15-22(23)28(21-6-5-7-24(40-3)29(21)41-4)42-25(30(34)39)16-26(36)33-12-10-19(11-13-33)14-27(37)38/h5-9,15,19,25,28,35H,10-14,16-18H2,1-4H3,(H,37,38)/t25-,28-/m1/s1; Key:HDGUKVZPMPJBFK-LEAFIULHSA-N

Lapaquistat (TAK-475) is a cholesterol-lowering drug candidate that was abandoned before being marketed.

Unlike statins, which inhibit HMG-CoA reductase, lapaquistat metabolites inhibit squalene synthase, which is further downstream in the synthesis of cholesterol. It is hoped that side effects can be reduced by not disturbing the mevalonate pathway, which is important for other biochemical molecules besides cholesterol. However, there is increasing evidence that statins (which inhibit the mevalonate pathway) may be clinically useful because they affect these other molecules (including protein prenylation).

On March 28, 2008, Takeda halted further development of lapaquistat. While effective at lowering low-density lipoprotein cholesterol in a dose-dependent manner, development of the drug was ceased due to observations in clinical trials that it might cause liver damage in the high dose trial groups. Data from knockout mouse studies suggests that accumulation of high levels of the metabolic substrate of squalene synthase and derivatives thereof account for the liver toxicity of squalene synthase inhibitors, and efforts to mitigate this substrate accumulation would likely be necessary for clinical success of a squalene synthase inhibitor
