= Farnesyl-diphosphate farnesyltransferase =

Class of enzymes

Squalene synthase
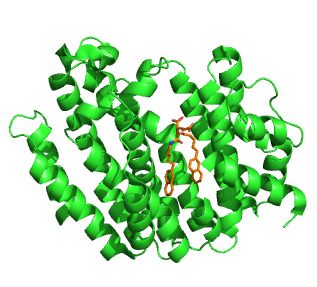
- Human Squalene synthase in complex with inhibitor. PDB 3q30

Identifiers
- EC no.: 2.5.1.21
- CAS no.: 9077-14-9

Databases
- BRENDA: enzyme data
- ExPASy: NiceZyme view
- KEGG: enzyme entry
- MetaCyc: metabolic pathway
- Rhea: reactions
- PDB structures: RCSB PDB PDBe PDBsum
- Gene Ontology: AmiGO / QuickGO
Search
- PMC: articles
- PubMed: articles
- NCBI: proteins

farnesyl-diphosphate farnesyltransferase 1

Identifiers
- Symbol: FDFT1
- NCBI gene: 2222
- HGNC: 3629
- OMIM: 184420
- RefSeq: NM_004462
- UniProt: P37268

Other data
- EC number: 2.5.1.21
- Locus: Chr. 8 p23.1-p22
Search for
- Structures: Swiss-model
- Domains: InterPro

Squalene synthase (SQS) or farnesyl-diphosphate:farnesyl-diphosphate farnesyl transferase is an enzyme localized to the membrane of the endoplasmic reticulum. SQS participates in the isoprenoid biosynthetic pathway, catalyzing a two-step reaction in which two identical molecules of farnesyl pyrophosphate (FPP) are converted into squalene, with the consumption of NADPH. Catalysis by SQS is the first committed step in sterol synthesis, since the squalene produced is converted exclusively into various sterols, such as cholesterol, via a complex, multi-step pathway. SQS belongs to squalene/phytoene synthase family of proteins.

== Diversity ==
Squalene synthase has been characterized in animals, plants, and yeast. In terms of structure and mechanics, squalene synthase closely resembles phytoene synthase (PHS), another prenyltransferase. PHS serves a similar role to SQS in plants and bacteria, catalyzing the synthesis of phytoene, a precursor of carotenoid compounds.

== Structure ==
Squalene synthase (SQS) is localized exclusively to the membrane of the endoplasmic reticulum (ER). SQS is anchored to the membrane by a short C-terminal membrane-spanning domain. The N-terminal catalytic domain of the enzyme protrudes into the cytosol, where the soluble substrates are bound. Mammalian forms of SQS are approximately 47kDa and consist of ~416 amino acids. The crystal structure of human SQS was determined in 2000, and revealed that the protein was composed entirely of α-helices. The enzyme is folded into a single domain, characterized by a large central channel. The active sites of both of the two half-reactions catalyzed by SQS are located within this channel. One end of the channel is open to the cytosol, whereas the other end forms a hydrophobic pocket. SQS contains two conserved aspartate-rich sequences, which are believed to participate directly in the catalytic mechanism. These aspartate-rich motifs are one of several conserved structural features in class I isoprenoid biosynthetic enzymes, although these enzymes do not share sequence homology.

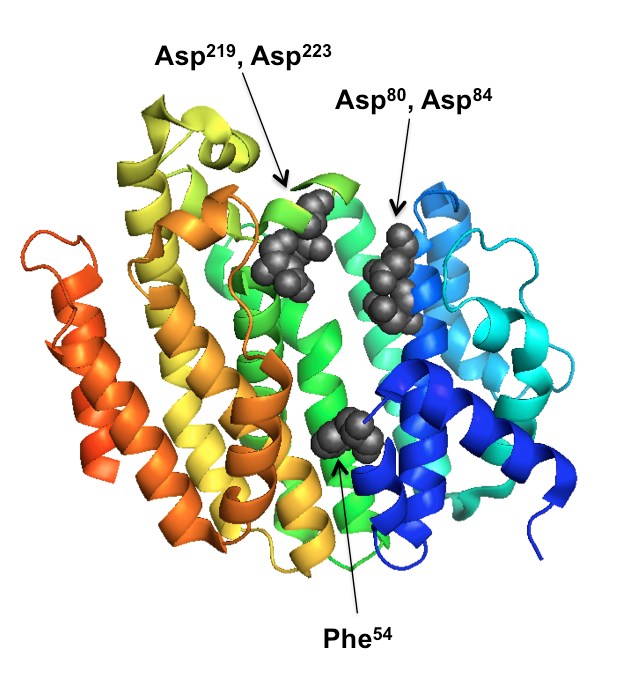
Squalene Synthase (Human). Key residues in the central channel are shown as spheres.

== Mechanism ==
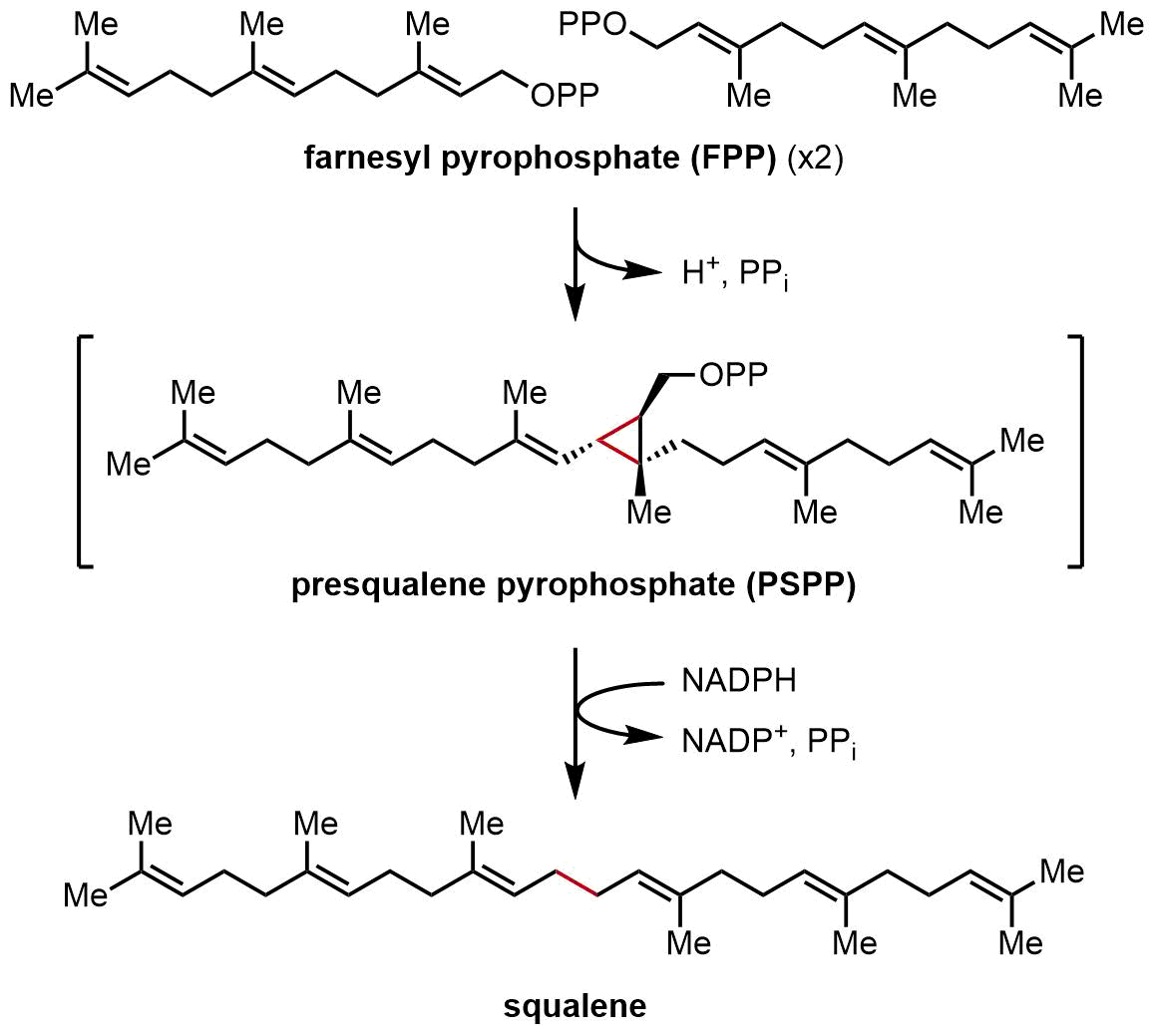

Squalene synthase (SQS) catalyzes the reductive dimerization of farnesyl pyrophosphate (FPP), in which two identical molecules of FPP are converted into one molecule of squalene. The reaction occurs in two steps, proceeding through the intermediate presqualene pyrophosphate (PSPP). FPP is a soluble allylic compound containing 15 carbon atoms (C_{15}), whereas squalene is an insoluble, C_{30} isoprenoid. This reaction is a head-to-head terpene synthesis, because the two FPP molecules are both joined at the C4 position and form a 1-1' linkage. This stands in contrast to the 1'-4 linkages that are much more common in isoprene biosynthesis than 4-4' linkages. The reaction mechanism of SQS requires a divalent cation, often Mg^{2+}, to facilitate binding of the pyrophosphate groups on FPP.

=== FPP condensation ===
In the first half-reaction, two identical molecules of farnesyl pyrophosphate (FPP) are bound to squalene synthase (SQS) in a sequential manner. The FPP molecules bind to distinct regions of the enzyme, and with different binding affinities. Starting at the top of the catalytic cycle below, the reaction begins with the ionization of FPP to generate an allylic carbocation. A tyrosine residue (Tyr-171) plays a critical role in this step by serving as a proton donor to facilitate abstraction of pyrophosphate. Moreover, the resulting phenolate anion can stabilize the resulting carbocation through cation-π interactions, which would be particularly strong due to the highly electron-rich nature of the phenolate anion. The allylic cation generated is then attacked by the olefin of a second molecule of FPP, affording a tertiary carbocation. The phenolate anion generated previously then serves as a base to abstract a proton from this adduct to form a cyclopropane product, presqualene pyrophosphate (PSPP). The PSPP created remains associated with SQS for the second reaction. The importance of a tyrosine residue in this process was demonstrated by mutagenesis studies with rat SQS (rSQS), and by the fact that Tyr-171 is conserved in all known SQSs (and PHSs). In rSQS, Tyr-171 was converted to aromatic residues Phe and Trp, as well as hydroxyl-containing residue Ser. None of these mutants were able to convert FPP to PSPP or squalene, demonstrating that aromatic rings or alcohols alone are insufficient for converting FPP to PSPP.

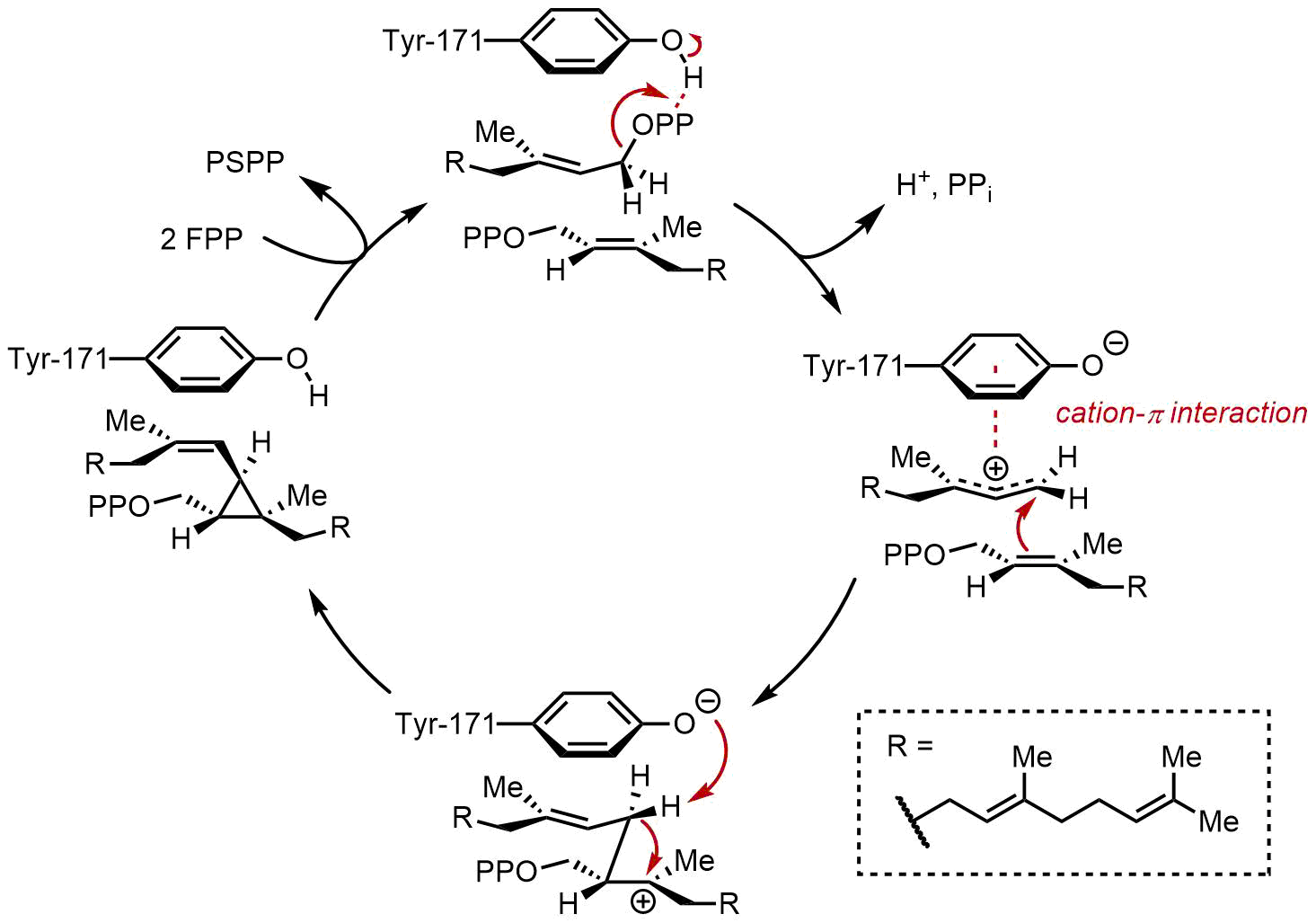

=== PSPP rearrangement and reduction ===
In the second half-reaction of SQS, presqualene pyrophosphate (PSPP) moves to a second reaction site within SQS. Keeping PSPP in the central channel of SQS is thought to protect the reactive intermediate from reacting with water. From PSPP, squalene is formed by a series of carbocation rearrangements. The process begins with ionization of pyrophosphate, giving a cyclopropylcarbinyl cation. The cation rearranges by a 1,2-migration of a cyclopropane C–C bond to the carbocation, forming the bond shown in blue to give a cyclobutyl carbocation. Subsequently, a second 1,2-migration occurs to form another cyclopropylcarbinyl cation, with the cation resting on a tertiary carbon. This resulting carbocation is then ring-opened by a hydride delivered by NADPH, giving squalene, which is then released by SQS into the membrane of the endoplasmic reticulum.

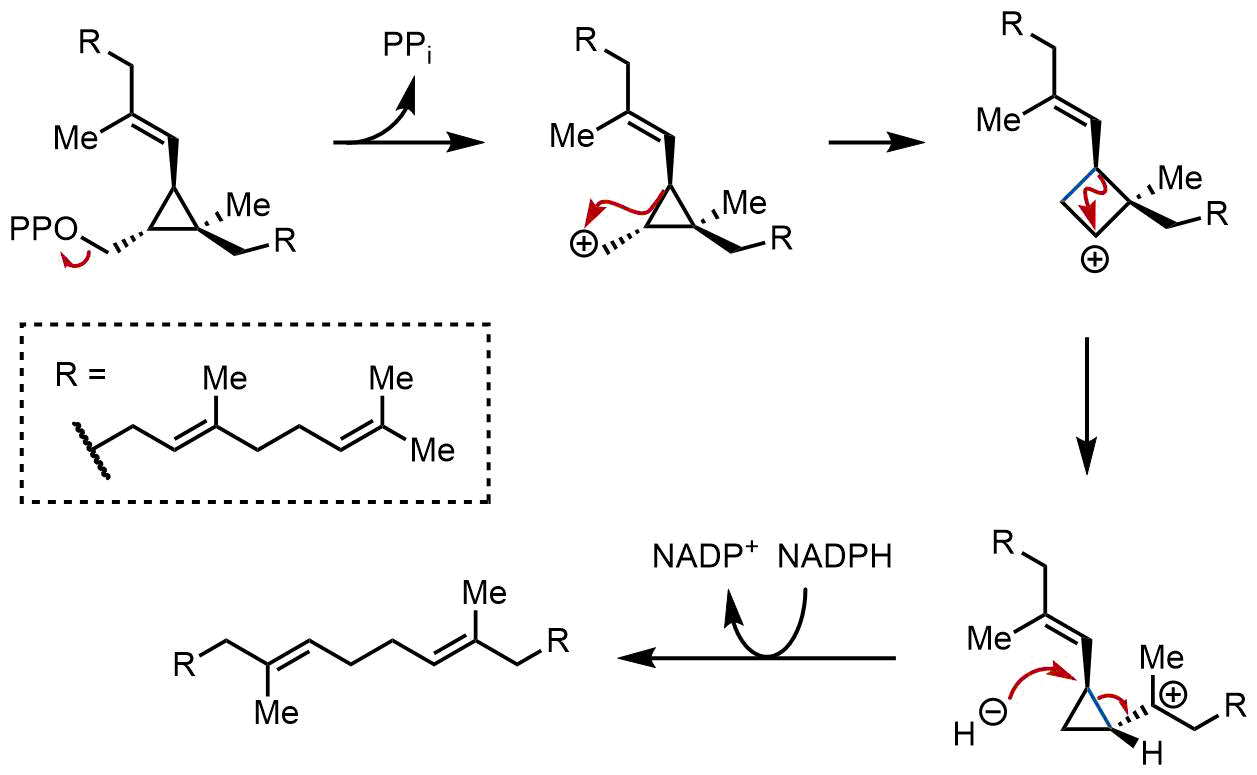

While cyclopropylcarbinyl-cyclopropylcarbinyl rearrangements can proceed through discrete cyclobutyl cation intermediates, the supposed cyclobutyl cation could not be trapped in model studies. Thus, the cyclobutyl cation may actually be a transition state between the two cyclopropylcarbinyl cations, rather than a discrete intermediate. The stereochemistry of the intermediates and the olefin geometry in the final product is dictated by the suprafacial nature of the 1,2-shifts and stereoelectronic requirements. While other mechanisms have been proposed, the mechanism shown above is supported by isolation of rillingol, which is the alcohol formed from trapping the second cyclopropylcarbinyl cation with water.

== Regulation ==
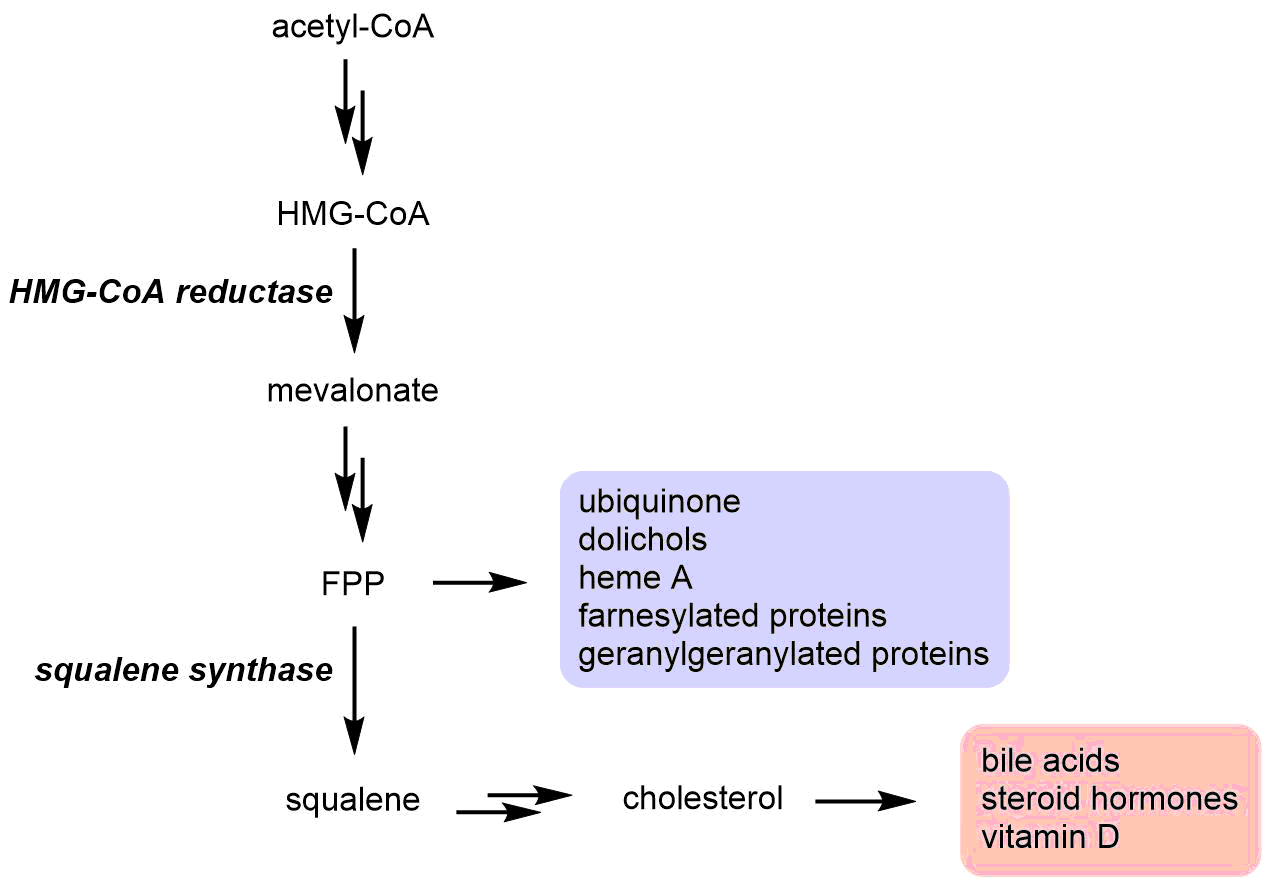
Branching of the mevalonate pathway at FPP to sterol and non-sterol products.

FPP is an important metabolic intermediate in the mevalonate pathway that represents a major branch point in terpenoid pathways. FPP is used to form several important classes of compounds in addition to sterols (via squalene), including ubiquinone and dolichols. SQS catalyzes the first committed step in sterol biosynthesis from FPP, and is therefore important for controlling the flux towards sterol vs. non-sterol products. The activity of SQS is intimately related to the activity of HMG-CoA reductase, which catalyzes the rate-limiting step of the mevalonate pathway. High levels of LDL-derived cholesterol inhibit HMG-CoA reductase activity significantly, since mevalonate is no longer needed for sterol production. However, residual HMG-CoA reductase activity is observed even with very high LDL levels, such that FPP can be made for forming non-sterol products essential for cell growth. To prevent this residual FPP from being used for sterol synthesis when sterols are abundant, SQS activity declines significantly when LDL levels are high. This suppression of SQS activity is better thought of as a flux control mechanism, rather than a way to regulate cholesterol levels. This is since HMG-CoA reductase is the more significant control factor for regulating cholesterol synthesis (its activity is 98% inhibited when LDL levels are high).

=== Regulation by sterols ===
SQS regulation occurs primarily at the level of SQS gene transcription. The sterol regulatory element binding protein (SREBP) class of transcription factors is central to regulating genes involved in cholesterol homeostasis, and is important for controlling levels of SQS transcription. When sterol levels are low, an inactive form of SREBP is cleaved to form the active transcription factor, which moves to the nucleus to induce transcription of the SQS gene. Of the three known SREBP transcription factors, only SREBP-1a and SREBP-2 activate SQS gene transcription in transgenic mouse livers. In cultured HepG2 cells, SREBP-1a appears more important than SREBP-2 in controlling activation of the SQS promoter. However, SQS promoters have been shown to respond differently to SREBP-1a and SREBP-2 in different experimental systems.

Aside from SREBPs, accessory transcription factors are needed for maximal activation of the SQS promoter. Promoter studies using luciferase reporter gene assays revealed that the Sp1, and NF-Y and/or CREB transcription factors are also important for SQS promoter activation. NF-Y and/or CREB are required for SREBP-1a to fully activate the SQS promoter, although Sp1 is also needed for SREBP-2 to do so.

== Interactive pathway map ==
Click on genes, proteins and metabolites below to link to respective articles. (Note: The interactive pathway map can be edited at WikiPathways: "Statin_Pathway_WP430".)

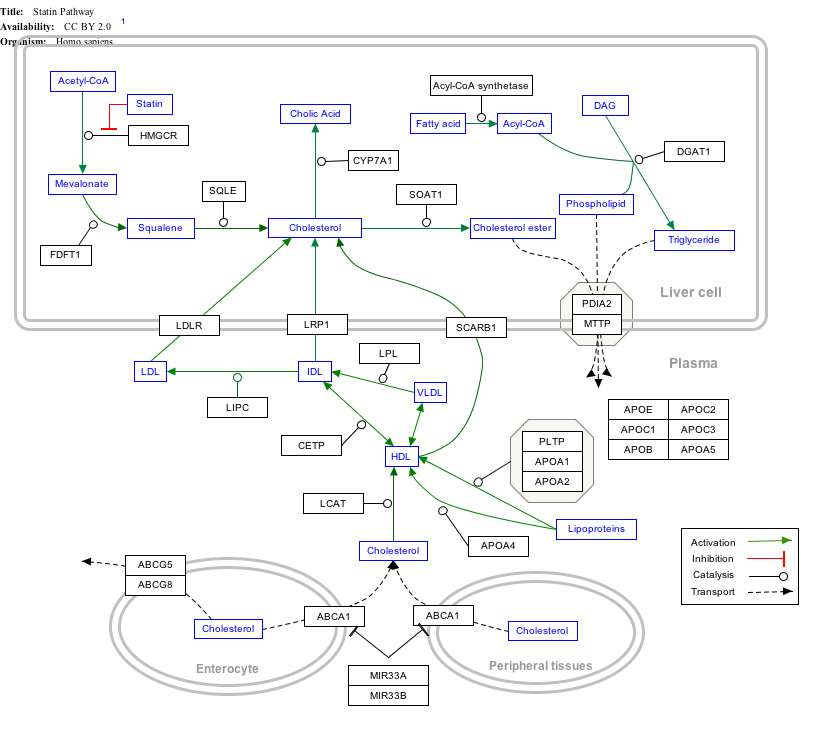

Statin pathway edit

== Biological function ==
Squalene synthase (SQS) is an enzyme participating in the isoprenoid biosynthetic pathway. SQS synthase catalyzes the branching point between sterol and nonsterol biosynthesis, and commits farnesyl pyrophosphate (FPP) exclusively to production of sterols. An important sterol produced by this pathway is cholesterol, which is used in cell membranes and for the synthesis of hormones. SQS competes with several other enzymes for use of FPP, since it is a precursor for a variety of terpenoids. Decreases in SQS activity limit flux of FPP to the sterol pathway, and increase the production of nonsterol products. Important nonsterol products include ubiquinone, dolichols, heme A, and farnesylated proteins

Development of squalene synthase knockout mice has demonstrated that loss of squalene synthase is lethal, and that the enzyme is essential for development of the central nervous system.

== Disease relevance ==
Squalene synthase is a target for the regulation of cholesterol levels. Increased expression of SQS has been shown to elevate cholesterol levels in mice. Therefore, inhibitors of SQS are of great interest in the treatment of hypercholesterolemia and prevention of coronary heart disease (CHD). It has also been suggested that variants in this enzyme may be part of a genetic association with hypercholesterolemia.

=== Squalene synthase inhibitors ===
Squalene synthase inhibitors have been shown to decrease cholesterol synthesis, as well as to decrease plasma triglyceride levels. SQS inhibitors may provide an alternative to HMG-CoA reductase inhibitors (statins), which have problematic side effects for some patients. Squalene synthase inhibitors that have been investigated for use in the prevention of cardiovascular disease include lapaquistat (TAK-475), zaragozic acid, and RPR 107393. Despite reaching phase II clinical trials, lapaquistat was discontinued by 2008.

Squalene synthase homolog inhibition in Staphylococcus aureus is currently being investigated as a virulence factor-based antibacterial therapy.
