= Squalene/phytoene synthase family =

SQS_PSY

Identifiers
- Symbol: SQS_PSY
- Pfam: PF00494
- InterPro: IPR002060
- PROSITE: PDOC00802
- SCOP2: 1ezf / SCOPe / SUPFAM
- OPM superfamily: 297
- OPM protein: 3v66
- Membranome: 635
Available protein structures:
- PDB: IPR002060 PF00494 (ECOD; PDBsum)
- AlphaFold: IPR002060; PF00494

The squalene/phytoene synthase family represents proteins that catalyze the head-to-head condensation of C_{15} and C_{20} prenyl units (i.e. farnesyl diphosphate and geranylgeranyl diphosphate). This enzymatic step constitutes part of steroid and carotenoid biosynthesis pathway. Squalene synthase EC (SQS) and Phytoene synthase EC (PSY) are two well-known examples of this protein family and share a number of functional similarities. These similarities are also reflected in their primary structure. In particular three well conserved regions are shared by SQS and PSY; they could be involved in substrate binding and/or the catalytic mechanism. SQS catalyzes the conversion of two molecules of farnesyl diphosphate (FPP) into squalene. It is the first committed step in the cholesterol biosynthetic pathway. The reaction carried out by SQS is catalyzed in two separate steps: the first is a head-to-head condensation of the two molecules of FPP to form presqualene diphosphate; this intermediate is then rearranged in a NADP-dependent reduction, to form squalene:

2 FPP -> presqualene diphosphate + NADP -> squalene

SQS is found in all three domains of life; eukaryotes, archaea (haloarchaea) and bacteria. A recent phylogenetic analysis suggests a bacterial origin of SQS and a later horizontal transfer of the SQS gene to a common ancestor of eukaryotes. Some bacteria are known to alternatively possess a set of three genes to biosynthesize squalene (HpnCDE). HpnC and HpnD are homologous to each other and seem to have co-evolved in HpnCDE-containing species, together with HpnE. HpnCD are further homologous to SQS and PSY and thus are members of the squalene/phytoene synthase family. HpnCD and SQS are inferred to have evolved independently from a PSY homolog.

In yeast, SQS is encoded by the ERG9 gene, in mammals by the FDFT1 gene. SQS is membrane-bound.

PSY catalyzes the conversion of two molecules of geranylgeranyl diphosphate (GGPP) into phytoene. It is the second step in the biosynthesis of carotenoids from isopentenyl diphosphate. The reaction carried out by PSY is catalyzed in two separate steps: the first is a head-to-head condensation of the two molecules of GGPP to form prephytoene diphosphate; this intermediate is then rearranged to form phytoene.

2 GGPP -> prephytoene diphosphate -> phytoene

PSY is found in all organisms that synthesize carotenoids: plants and photosynthetic bacteria as well as some non-photosynthetic bacteria and fungi. In bacteria PSY is encoded by the gene crtB. In plants PSY is localized in the chloroplast. While PSY/CrtB catalyzes the head-to-head condensation for the C_{20} prenyl unit (GGPP), a group of homologous proteins labelled as CrtM catalyze the same enzymatic reaction for the C_{15} unit (FPP). The product of two FPP condensation is dehydrosqualene (diapophytoene). CrtB and CrtM share a common ancestry, but it is not known which evolved first.

While the substrates FPP and GGPP are amphipathic, the products squalene, dehydrosqualene and phytoene are all hydrophobic. Thus, the subsequent enzymatic steps in the steroid and carotenoid biosynthesis take place in the cellular membranes of host organisms.
