= Oxycholesterol =

Names
- IUPAC name 5,6β-Epoxy-5β-cholestan-3β-ol
- Systematic IUPAC name (3S,4aS,5aR,6aS,6bS,9R,9aR,11aS,11bR)-9a,11b-Dimethyl-9-[(2R)-6-methylheptan-2-yl]hexadecahydrocyclopenta[1,2]phenanthro[8a,9-b]oxiren-3-ol

Identifiers
CAS Number	4025-59-6
3D model (JSmol)	Interactive image
ChemSpider	97204
PubChem CID	108109
UNII	PFD65A4X36
CompTox Dashboard (EPA)	DTXSID501314152
- InChI: InChI=1S/C27H46O2/c1-17(2)7-6-8-18(3)21-9-10-22-20-15-24-27(29-24)16-19(28)11-14-26(27,5)23(20)12-13-25(21,22)4/h17-24,28H,6-16H2,1-5H3/t18-,19+,20+,21-,22+,23+,24-,25-,26-,27-/m1/s1 Key: PRYIJAGAEJZDBO-DTLXENBRSA-N; InChI=1/C27H46O2/c1-17(2)7-6-8-18(3)21-9-10-22-20-15-24-27(29-24)16-19(28)11-14-26(27,5)23(20)12-13-25(21,22)4/h17-24,28H,6-16H2,1-5H3/t18-,19+,20+,21-,22+,23+,24-,25-,26-,27-/m1/s1 Key: PRYIJAGAEJZDBO-DTLXENBRBQ
- SMILES: C[C@H](CCCC(C)C)[C@H]1CC[C@@H]2[C@@]1(CC[C@H]3[C@H]2C[C@@H]4[C@]5([C@@]3(CC[C@@H](C5)O)C)O4)C

Properties
Chemical formula	C_{27}H_{46}O_{2}
Molar mass	402.663 g·mol^{−1}
- Except where otherwise noted, data are given for materials in their standard state (at 25 °C [77 °F], 100 kPa). Infobox references

Oxycholesterol or 5,6-epoxycholesterol is a form of oxidized cholesterol implicated in atherosclerosis. It is commonly formed from the reaction of fats and oxygen during high temperature cooking such as frying.

In a study about the effects of oxycholesterol in rabbits with induced hypercholesterolemia, it was shown that compared feeding rabbits cholesterol and unoxidized cholesterol, feeding rabbits oxycholesterol resulted in their developing much higher levels of total cholesterol and low-density lipoprotein cholesterol. It is also shown to increase the amount of homocysteine and asymmetric dimethylarginine levels in the rabbits. An abundance of homocysteine leads to an organism with greater chances of endothelial cell injury which can then lead to coronary artery disease. Asymmetric dimethylarginine is shown to cause adverse effects on humans in the form of cardiovascular and metabolic diseases. Therefore it was concluded that adding oxycholesterol into diets of animals with hypercholesterolemia increases endothelial dysfunction and inflammatory response.

== See also ==
- Oxysterol
