= Liver X receptor alpha =

Nuclear receptor protein found in humans

NR1H3
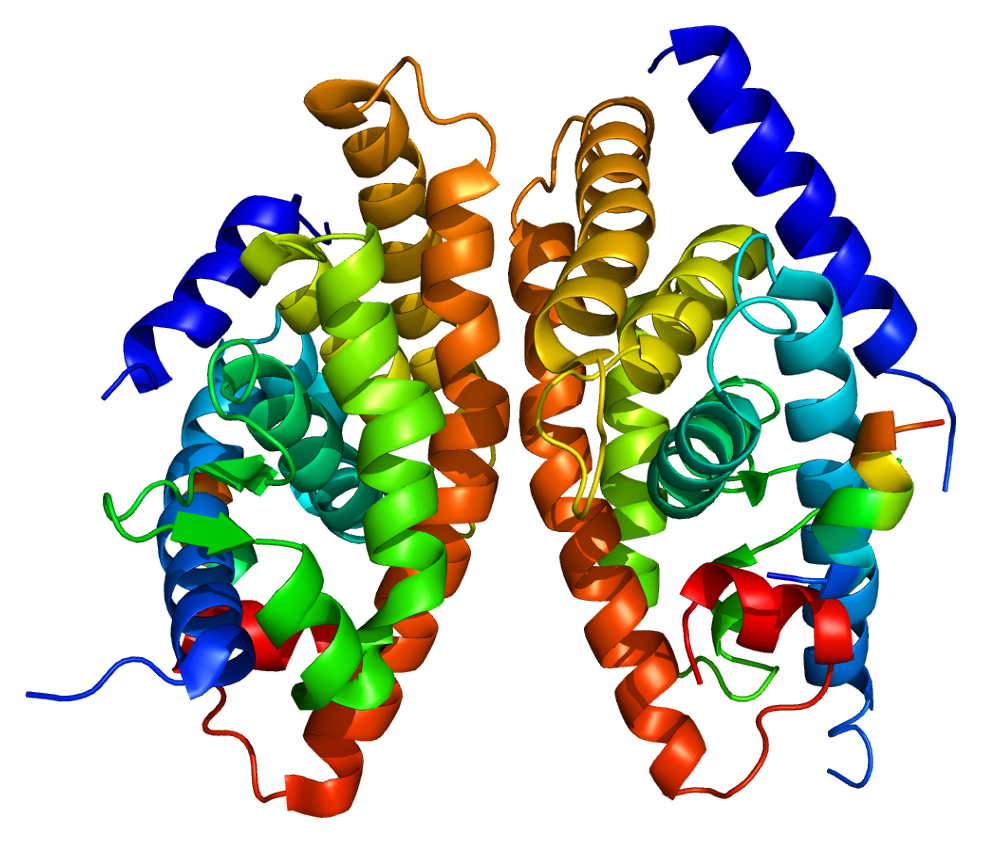

Identifiers
- Aliases: NR1H3, LXR-a, LXRA, RLD-1, Liver X receptor alpha, nuclear receptor subfamily 1 group H member 3
- External IDs: OMIM: 602423; MGI: 1352462; GeneCards: NR1H3
Available structures
PDB	Ortholog search: PDBe RCSB
PDB	List of PDB id codes 1UHL, 3IPQ, 3IPS, 3IPU, 5AVI, 5AVL, 5HJS

Gene location (Human)
Chr.	Chromosome 11 (human)
Band	11p11.2	Start	47,248,300 bp
Band	11p11.2	End	47,269,032 bp

Gene location (Mouse)
Chr.	Chromosome 2 (mouse)
Band	2 E1|2 50.52 cM	Start	91,014,406 bp
Band	2 E1|2 50.52 cM	End	91,033,179 bp
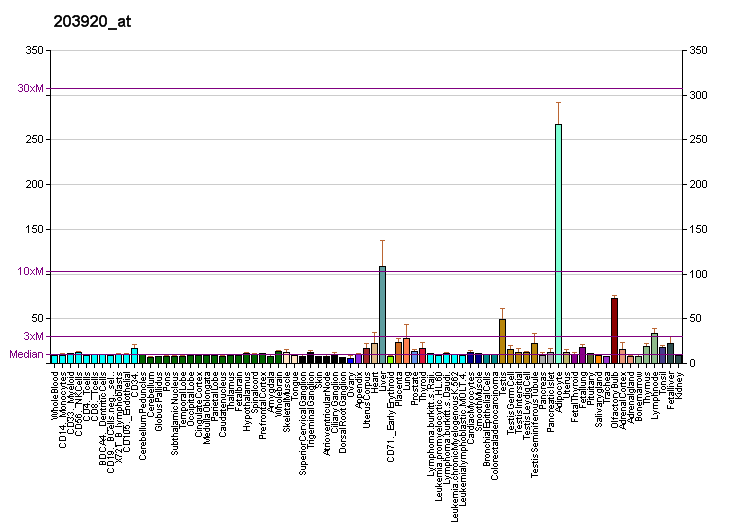
RNA expression pattern
Bgee	Human / Mouse (ortholog); Top expressed in: right lobe of liver; mucosa of transverse colon; spleen; tibial nerve; subcutaneous adipose tissue; canal of the cervix; gallbladder; lymph node; right lobe of thyroid gland; right adrenal cortex / Top expressed in: right kidney; left lobe of liver; Ileal epithelium; muscle of thigh; lactiferous gland; proximal tubule; brown adipose tissue; white adipose tissue; subcutaneous adipose tissue; duodenum; More reference expression data
BioGPS	More reference expression data
Gene ontology
Molecular function	cholesterol binding; protein binding; zinc ion binding; nuclear receptor activity; sterol response element binding; steroid hormone receptor activity; DNA binding; sequence-specific DNA binding; metal ion binding; DNA-binding transcription factor activity; DNA-binding transcription factor activity, RNA polymerase II-specific; transcription coactivator activity; transcription cis-regulatory region binding; RNA polymerase II transcription regulatory region sequence-specific DNA binding; transcription factor binding; nuclear receptor coactivator activity; signaling receptor activity
Cellular component	receptor complex; nucleoplasm; RNA polymerase II transcription regulator complex; nucleus; cytoplasm
Biological process	positive regulation of toll-like receptor 4 signaling pathway; sterol homeostasis; negative regulation of pancreatic juice secretion; negative regulation of inflammatory response; cellular response to lipopolysaccharide; negative regulation of lipid transport; positive regulation of lipoprotein lipase activity; lipid homeostasis; triglyceride homeostasis; negative regulation of macrophage activation; negative regulation of macrophage derived foam cell differentiation; positive regulation of cholesterol transport; negative regulation of cholesterol storage; regulation of transcription, DNA-templated; positive regulation of triglyceride biosynthetic process; positive regulation of cholesterol efflux; positive regulation of protein metabolic process; negative regulation of interferon-gamma-mediated signaling pathway; regulation of circadian rhythm; transcription, DNA-templated; negative regulation of transcription by RNA polymerase II; response to progesterone; steroid hormone mediated signaling pathway; apoptotic cell clearance; positive regulation of fatty acid biosynthetic process; transcription initiation from RNA polymerase II promoter; positive regulation of transcription by RNA polymerase II; negative regulation of secretion of lysosomal enzymes; negative regulation of pinocytosis; positive regulation of transcription, DNA-templated; intracellular receptor signaling pathway; cholesterol homeostasis; lipid metabolism; multicellular organism development; cell differentiation; negative regulation of cold-induced thermogenesis
Sources:Amigo / QuickGO
Orthologs
Databases	NCBI: entry; OMA: entry
Species	Human	Mouse
Entrez	10062	22259
Ensembl	ENSG00000025434	ENSMUSG00000002108
UniProt	Q13133	Q9Z0Y9
RefSeq (mRNA)	NM_001130101; NM_001130102; NM_001251934; NM_001251935; NM_005693	NM_001177730; NM_013839; NM_001355279
RefSeq (protein)	NP_001123573; NP_001123574; NP_001238863; NP_001238864; NP_005684 NP_001350524; NP_005684.2	NP_001171201; NP_038867; NP_001342208
Location (UCSC)	Chr 11: 47.25 – 47.27 Mb	Chr 2: 91.01 – 91.03 Mb
PubMed search
- Wikidata
View/Edit Human	View/Edit Mouse

Liver X receptor alpha (LXR-alpha) is a nuclear receptor protein that in humans is encoded by the NR1H3 gene (nuclear receptor subfamily 1, group H, member 3).

== Expression ==
miRNA hsa-miR-613 autoregulates the human LXRα gene by targeting the endogenous LXRα through its specific miRNA response element (613MRE) within the LXRα 3′-untranslated region. LXRα autoregulates its own suppression via induction of SREBP1c which upregulates miRNA has-miR-613.

== Function ==
The liver X receptors, LXRα (this protein) and LXRβ, form a subfamily of the nuclear receptor superfamily and are key regulators of macrophage function, controlling transcriptional programs involved in lipid homeostasis and inflammation. Additionally, they play an important role in the local activation of thyroid hormones via deiodinases. The inducible LXRα is highly expressed in liver, adrenal gland, intestine, adipose tissue, macrophages, lung, and kidney, whereas LXRβ is ubiquitously expressed. Ligand-activated LXRs form obligate heterodimers with retinoid X receptors (RXRs) and regulate expression of target genes containing LXR response elements. Restoration of LXR-alpha expression/function within a psoriatic lesion may help to switch the transition from psoriatic to symptomless skin.

== Interactions ==
Liver X receptor alpha has been shown to interact with EDF1 and small heterodimer partner. LXRα activates the transcription factor SREBP-1c, resulting in lipogenesis.

== Link to multiple sclerosis ==
In 2016, a study found 70% of individuals in two families with a rare form of rapidly progressing multiple sclerosis had a mutation in NR1H3. However, an analysis from The International Multiple Sclerosis Genetics Consortium using a 13-fold larger sample size could not find any evidence that the mutation in question (p.Arg415Gln) associated with multiple sclerosis, refuting these findings.
