= Zaragozic acid =

Zaragozic acid A

Names
- Preferred IUPAC name (1S,3S,4S,5R,6R,7R)-1-[(4S,5R)-4-(Acetyloxy)-5-methyl-3-methylidene-6-phenylhexyl]-6-{[(2E,4S,6S)-4,6-dimethyloct-2-enoyl]oxy}-4,7-dihydroxy-2,8-dioxabicyclo[3.2.1]octane-3,4,5-tricarboxylic acid
- Other names Squalestatin 1

Identifiers
CAS Number	142561-96-4
3D model (JSmol)	Interactive image
ChEBI	CHEBI:75170
ChEMBL	ChEMBL40991
ChemSpider	4942838
IUPHAR/BPS	3057
PubChem CID	6438355
UNII	1117HVX02L
CompTox Dashboard (EPA)	DTXSID701018091
- InChI: InChI=1S/C35H46O14/c1-7-19(2)17-20(3)13-14-25(37)47-28-27(38)33(48-29(30(39)40)34(45,31(41)42)35(28,49-33)32(43)44)16-15-21(4)26(46-23(6)36)22(5)18-24-11-9-8-10-12-24/h8-14,19-20,22,26-29,38,45H,4,7,15-18H2,1-3,5-6H3,(H,39,40)(H,41,42)(H,43,44)/b14-13+/t19-,20+,22+,26+,27+,28+,29+,33-,34+,35-/m0/s1 Key: DFKDOZMCHOGOBR-NCSQYGPNSA-N; InChI=1/C35H46O14/c1-7-19(2)17-20(3)13-14-25(37)47-28-27(38)33(48-29(30(39)40)34(45,31(41)42)35(28,49-33)32(43)44)16-15-21(4)26(46-23(6)36)22(5)18-24-11-9-8-10-12-24/h8-14,19-20,22,26-29,38,45H,4,7,15-18H2,1-3,5-6H3,(H,39,40)(H,41,42)(H,43,44)/b14-13+/t19-,20+,22+,26+,27+,28+,29+,33-,34+,35-/m0/s1 Key: DFKDOZMCHOGOBR-NCSQYGPNBY
- SMILES: CC[C@H](C)C[C@H](C)/C=C/C(=O)O[C@@H]1[C@H]([C@]2(O[C@@H]([C@]([C@@]1(O2)C(=O)O)(C(=O)O)O)C(=O)O)CCC(=C)[C@H]([C@H](C)CC3=CC=CC=C3)OC(=O)C)O

Properties
Chemical formula	C_{35}H_{46}O_{14}
Molar mass	690.73134
- Except where otherwise noted, data are given for materials in their standard state (at 25 °C [77 °F], 100 kPa). verify (what is ?) Infobox references

Zaragozic acids are a family of natural products produced by fungi. The first characterized zaragozic acids, A, B, and C were isolated from an unidentified sterile fungal culture, Sporormiella intermedia, and L. elatius, respectively. just outside the European city Zaragoza, Spain on the Jalón river. This family of natural products possesses a unique 4,8-dioxabicyclo[3.2.1]octane core, and vary in their 1-alkyl and their 6-acyl side chains.

== Uses ==
Zaragozic acids are potent inhibitors of S. cerevisiae, fungal and mammalian squalene synthase and therefore inhibitors of sterol synthesis. Squalene synthase is the first committed enzyme in sterol synthesis, catalyzing the reductive condensation of farnesyl pyrophosphate to form squalene. As a squalene synthase inhibitor, zaragozic acid produces lower plasma cholesterol levels in primates. Treatment of rats with zaragozic acid A caused an increase in hepatic low density lipoprotein (LDL) receptor mRNA levels.

Zaragozic acids also mildly inhibit Ras farnesyl-protein transferase.

Zaragozic acid D and D2 have been isolated from the keratinophilic fungus Amauroascus niger.

== Biosynthesis ==
The core biosynthetic route is via a polyketide synthase pathway from 10 acetates, 4 methyls of methionines, 1 succinate, and 1 benzoic acid.
