= Liver X receptor =

Nuclear receptor

LXRα (nuclear receptor subfamily 1, group H, member 3)
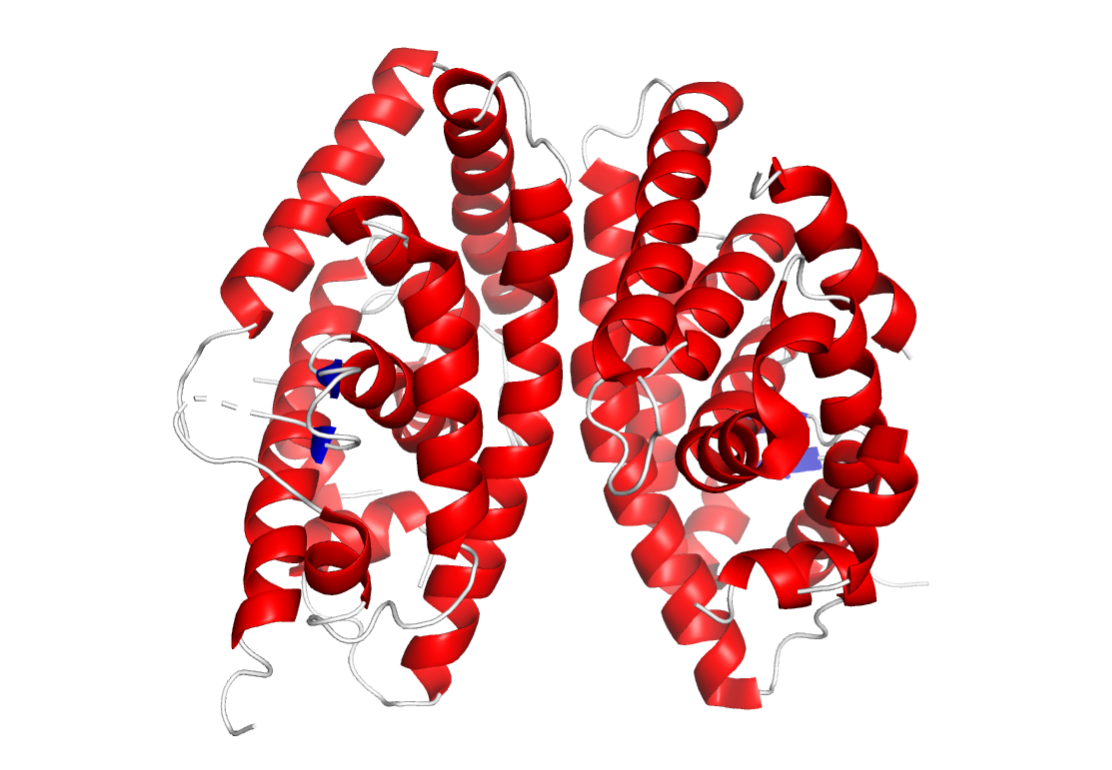
- LXRα-RXRβ heterodimeric structure (PDB 1UHL).

Identifiers
- Symbol: NR1H3
- NCBI gene: 10062
- HGNC: 7966
- OMIM: 602423
- RefSeq: NM_005693
- UniProt: Q13133
Search for
- Structures: Swiss-model
- Domains: InterPro

LXRβ (nuclear receptor subfamily 1, group H, member 2)

Identifiers
- Symbol: NR1H2
- Alt. symbols: UNR
- NCBI gene: 7376
- HGNC: 7965
- OMIM: 600380
- RefSeq: NM_007121
- UniProt: P55055
Search for
- Structures: Swiss-model
- Domains: InterPro

The liver X receptor (LXR) is a member of the nuclear receptor family of transcription factors and is closely related to nuclear receptors such as the PPARs, FXR and RXR. Liver X receptors (LXRs) are important regulators of cholesterol, fatty acid, and glucose homeostasis. LXRs were earlier classified as orphan nuclear receptors, however, upon discovery of endogenous oxysterols as ligands they were subsequently deorphanized.

Two isoforms of LXR have been identified and are referred to as LXRα and LXRβ. The liver X receptors are classified into subfamily 1 (thyroid hormone receptor-like) of the nuclear receptor superfamily, and are given the nuclear receptor nomenclature symbols NR1H3 (LXRα) and NR1H2 (LXRβ) respectively.

LXRα and LXRβ were discovered separately between 1994-1995. LXRα isoform was independently identified by two groups and initially named RLD-1 and LXR, whereas four groups identified the LXRβ isoform and called it UR, NER, OR-1, and RIP-15. The human LXRα gene is located on chromosome 11p11.2, while the LXRβ gene is located on chromosome 19q13.3.

== Expression ==
While the expression of LXRα and LXRβ in various tissues overlap the tissue distribution pattern of these two isoforms differ considerably. LXRα expression is restricted to liver, kidney, intestine, fat tissue, macrophages, lung, and spleen and is highest in liver, hence the name liver X receptor α (LXRα). LXRβ is expressed in almost all tissues and organs hence the early name UR (ubiquitous receptor). The different pattern of expression suggests that LXRα and LXRβ have different roles in regulating physiological function.

== Structure ==
Crystal structure of human liver X receptor β (LXRβ) forms a heterodimer with its partner retinoid X receptor α (RXRα) on its cognate element an AGGTCA direct repeat spaced by 4 nucleotides showing an extended X-shaped arrangement with DNA- and ligand-binding domains crossed. In contrast, the parallel domain arrangement of other NRs bind an AGGTCA direct repeat spaced by 1 nucleotide. The LXRβ core binds DNA via canonical contacts and auxiliary DNA contacts that enhance affinity for the response element.

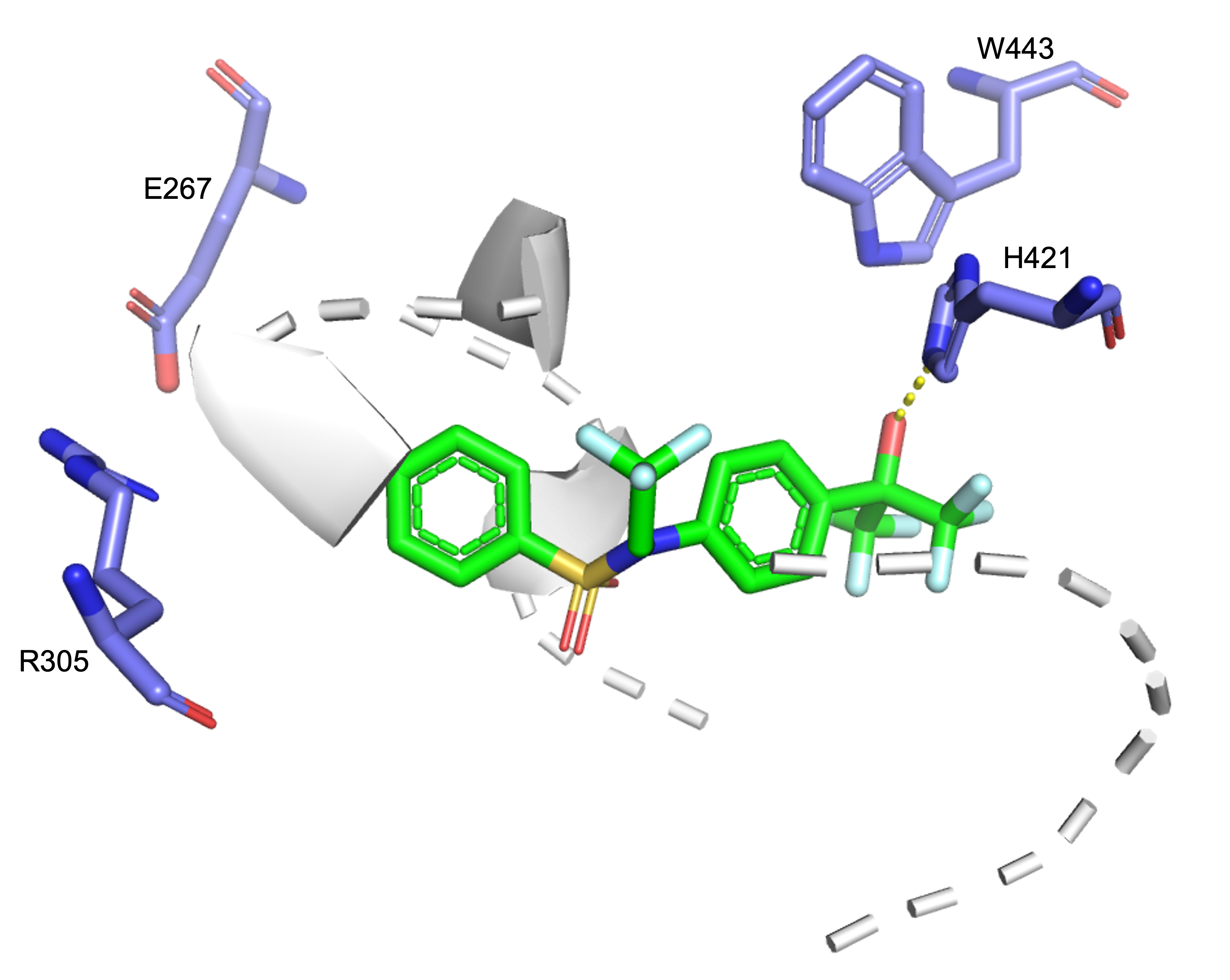
LXRα-RXRβ active site with T-0901317 bound (PDB 1UHL).

Crystal structure of human liver X receptor α (LXRα) also forms a heterodimer with its partner retinoid X receptor β (RXRβ). The LXRα-RXRβ heterodimer (PDB 1UHL) binds synthetic LXR oxysterol agonist T-0901317. The ligand-binding pocket predominantly consists of hydrophobic residues. The most critical residues to the binding pocket include E267, R305, H421, and W443. The binding pocket accommodates oxysterols of molecular volumes up to 400 Å^{3} and T-0901317 easily positions itself with a molecular volume of 304 Å^{3}. H421 forms a hydrogen bond with T-0901317's hydroxyl head group which lowers the pKa of the H421 imidazole side chain. As a result, the imidazole side chain interacts electrostatically with π-electrons of W443's indole side chain to stabilize the active conformation of the helices.

The phenyl group of T-0901317 extends toward the β-sheet side of the binding pocket and partially occupies it. The unoccupied section contains hydrophilic, polar residues E267 and R305. H421 and W443 anchor the 22-, 24-, or 27-hydroxyl group of an oxysterol to the binding pocket via hydrogen bonding and electrostatic interactions. The conformational flexibility of R305 allows it to bind the 3-hydroxyl group and stabilize an oxysterol.

== Activation/ligands ==
LXRα and LXRβ form heterodimers with the obligate partner retinoid X receptor (RXR), which is activated by 9-cis-13,14-dihydroretinoic acid. The LXR/RXR heterodimer can be activated with either an LXR agonist (oxysterols) or a RXR agonist (9-cis-13,14-dihydroretinoic acid). Oxysterols, the oxygenated derivatives of cholesterol, such as 22(R)-hydroxycholesterol, 24(S)-hydroxycholesterol, 27-hydroxycholesterol, and cholestenoic acid, are the natural ligands for LXR. After activation, LXR binds to LXR response element (LXRE), usually a variant of the idealized sequence AGGTCAN4AGGTCA, in the promoters of LXRs' target genes. Some synthetic LXR agonists have been developed, including nonsteroidal LXR agonists T0901317 and GW3965.

The hexacyclic aromatic ketones, anthrabenzoxocinone and bischloroanthrabenzoxocinone derived from a Streptomyces sp. have micromolar affinity for LXR-α.

== Target genes ==
LXR-RXR nuclear receptor heterodimers function as transcriptional regulators for genes involved in lipid metabolism, lipid homeostasis, and inflammation. Target genes of LXRs are involved in cholesterol and lipid metabolism regulation, including:

- ABC – ATP Binding Cassette transporter isoforms A1, G1, G5, and G8
- ApoE – Apolipoprotein E
- CETP – CholEsterylester Transfer Protein
- FAS – Fatty Acid Synthase
- CYP7A1 – CYtochrome P450 isoform 7A1 - cholesterol 7α-hydroxylase
- LPL – LipoProtein Lipase
- LXR-α – Liver X Receptor-α (a somewhat unusual example of receptor up-regulating its own expression)
- SREBP-1c – Sterol Regulatory Element Binding Protein 1c
- ChREBP – Carbohydrate Regulatory Element Binding Protein

== Role in metabolism ==
The importance of LXRs in physiological lipid and cholesterol metabolism suggests that they may influence the development of metabolic disorders such as hyperlipidemia and atherosclerosis. Evidence for this idea has been observed by recent studies that linked LXR activity to the pathogenesis of atherosclerosis. LXRα knockout mice are healthy when fed with a low-cholesterol diet. However, LXRα knockout mice develop enlarged fatty livers, degeneration of liver cells, high cholesterol levels in liver, and impaired liver function when fed a high-cholesterol diet. LXRβ knockout mice are unaffected by a high-cholesterol diet, suggesting that LXRα and LXRβ have separate roles. LXRs regulate fatty acid synthesis by modulating the expression of sterol regulatory element binding protein-1c (SREBP-1c). LXRs also regulate lipid homeostasis in the brain. LXRα and LXRβ double knockout mice develop neurodegenerative changes in brain tissue. LXRβ knockout mice results in adult-onset motor neuron degeneration in male mice.

Adiponectin induces ABCA1-mediated reverse cholesterol transport by activation of PPAR-γ and LXRα/β.

== Potential therapeutic applications of LXR agonists ==
LXR agonists are effective for treatment of murine models of atherosclerosis, diabetes, anti-inflammation, Alzheimer's disease, and cancer.

=== Cardiovascular ===
Treatment with LXR agonists (hypocholamide, T0901317, GW3965, or N,N-dimethyl-3beta-hydroxy-cholenamide (DMHCA)) lowers the cholesterol level in serum and liver and inhibits the development of atherosclerosis in murine disease models. Synthetic LXR agonist GW3965 improves glucose tolerance in a murine model of diet-induced obesity and insulin resistance by regulating genes involved in glucose metabolism in liver and adipose tissue. GW3965 inhibits the expression of inflammatory mediators in cultured macrophage and inflammation in mice.

Aberrant LXR signaling in macrophages due to the oxidized cholesterol 7-ketocholesterol promotes the inflammation that leads to atherosclerosis. For this reason, 7-ketocholesterol is a therapeutic target for the prevention and treatment of atherosclerosis.

When lipogenesis is increased by pharmacological activation of the liver X receptor, hepatic VLDL production is increased 2.5-fold, and the liver produces large TG-rich VLDL particles. Glucose induces expression of LXR target genes involved in cholesterol homeostasis like ABCA1 which is defective in Tangier disease. A common feature of many metabolic pathways is their control by retinoid X receptor (RXR) heterodimers. LXR heterodimerises with RXR. Promiscuous RXR also heterodimerises with PPAR members. PPAR-α plays a pivotal role in fatty acid catabolism in liver by upregulating the expression of numerous genes involved in mitochondrial fatty acid oxidation. Thus RXR is a common partner of two nuclear receptors acting in opposite directions with regard to fatty acid metabolism. So both LXR and PPAR-α compete for the limited pool of RXR and this dynamic equilibrium determines the direction of lipid metabolism.

Developing new potent and effective LXR agonists without the undesirable side effects may be beneficial for clinical usage. In this regard, DMHCA was reported to reduce atherosclerosis in apolipoprotein E-deficient mice without inducing hypertriglyceridemia and liver steatosis.

=== Alzheimer's disease ===
Treatment with T0901317 decreases amyloidal beta production in an Alzheimer's disease mouse model. However, both T0901317 and GW3965 have been reported to increase plasma and liver triglycerides in some mice models, indicating that T0901317 and GW3965 may not be a good candidate for a therapeutic agent.

=== Cancer ===
LXR agonists (T0901317, 22(R)-hydroxycholesterol, and 24(S)-hydroxycholesterol) were also shown to suppress the proliferation of prostate cancer and breast cancer cells as well as delay progression of prostate cancer from androgen-dependent status to androgen-independent status.
