= Prephytoene diphosphate =

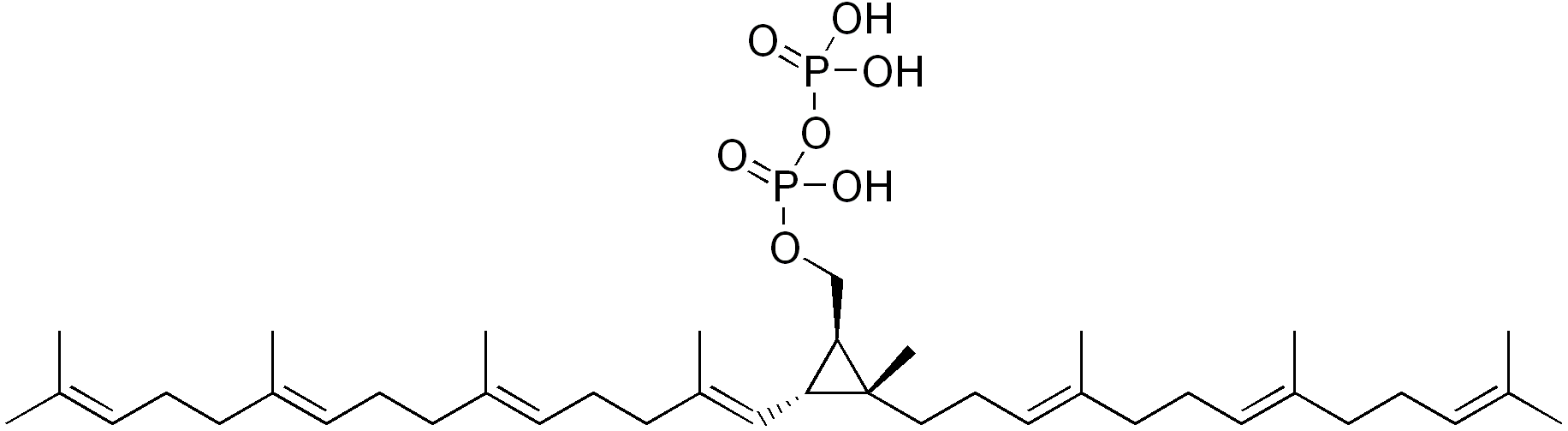

Names
- IUPAC name [(1R,2R,3R)-2-methyl-3-[(1E,5E,9E)-2,6,10,14-tetramethylpentadeca-1,5,9,13-tetraenyl]-2-[(3E,7E)-4,8,12-trimethyltrideca-3,7,11-trienyl]cyclopropyl]methyl phosphono hydrogen phosphate
- Other names Prephytoene pyrophosphate

Identifiers
CAS Number	38005-61-7
3D model (JSmol)	Interactive image
ChEBI	CHEBI:14885
ChemSpider	4517882
PubChem CID	5365949
UNII	9RE33T5G86
CompTox Dashboard (EPA)	DTXSID90958980
- InChI: InChI=1S/C40H68O7P2/c1-31(2)17-11-19-33(5)21-13-23-35(7)25-15-26-37(9)29-38-39(30-46-49(44,45)47-48(41,42)43)40(38,10)28-16-27-36(8)24-14-22-34(6)20-12-18-32(3)4/h17-18,21-22,25,27,29,38-39H,11-16,19-20,23-24,26,28,30H2,1-10H3,(H,44,45)(H2,41,42,43)/b33-21+,34-22+,35-25+,36-27+,37-29+ Key: RVCNKTPCHZNAAO-QKUGLALCSA-N; InChI=1/C40H68O7P2/c1-31(2)17-11-19-33(5)21-13-23-35(7)25-15-26-37(9)29-38-39(30-46-49(44,45)47-48(41,42)43)40(38,10)28-16-27-36(8)24-14-22-34(6)20-12-18-32(3)4/h17-18,21-22,25,27,29,38-39H,11-16,19-20,23-24,26,28,30H2,1-10H3,(H,44,45)(H2,41,42,43)/b33-21+,34-22+,35-25+,36-27+,37-29+ Key: RVCNKTPCHZNAAO-QKUGLALCBM
- SMILES: O=P(O)(O)OP(=O)(O)OCC1C(\C=C(/C)CC\C=C(/C)CC\C=C(/C)CC\C=C(/C)C)C1(CC/C=C(/CC\C=C(/C)CC\C=C(/C)C)C)C

Properties
Chemical formula	C_{40}H_{68}O_{7}P_{2}
Molar mass	722.91 g/mol
- Except where otherwise noted, data are given for materials in their standard state (at 25 °C [77 °F], 100 kPa). verify (what is ?) Infobox references

Prephytoene diphosphate is a carotenoid precursor. It has the chemical formula C_{40}H_{68}O_{7}P_{2}.
