= Liver X receptor beta =

Protein-coding gene in the species Homo sapiens

NR1H2
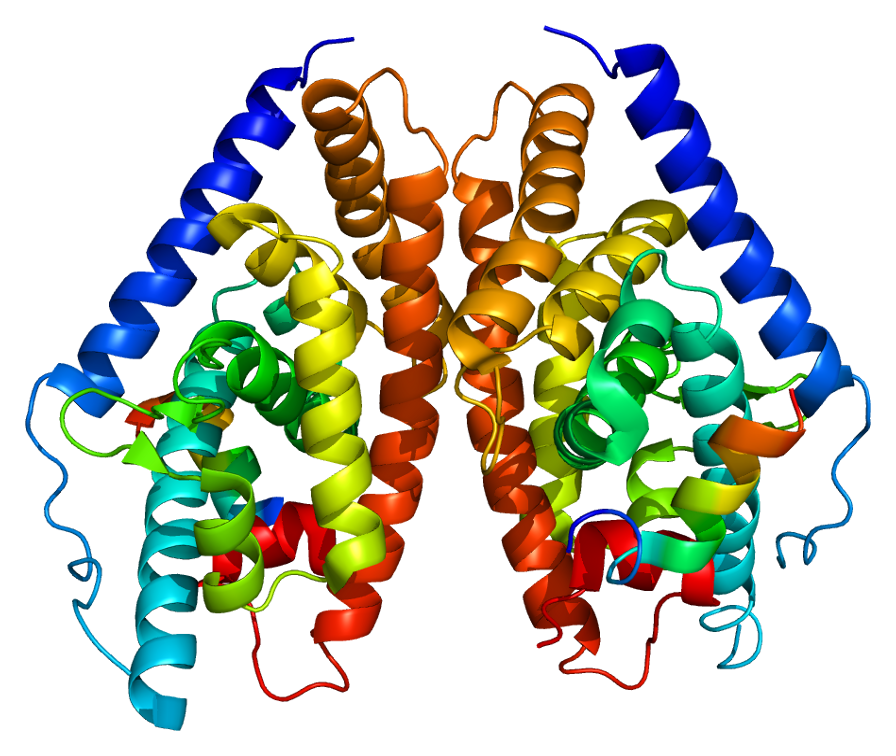

Identifiers
- Aliases: NR1H2, LXR-b, LXRB, NER, NER-I, RIP15, UNR, Liver X receptor beta, nuclear receptor subfamily 1 group H member 2
- External IDs: OMIM: 600380; MGI: 1352463; GeneCards: NR1H2
Available structures
PDB	Ortholog search: PDBe RCSB
PDB	List of PDB id codes 1P8D, 1PQ6, 1PQ9, 1PQC, 1UPV, 1UPW, 3KFC, 3L0E, 4DK7, 4DK8, 4RAK, 5HJP, 4NQA, 5I4V,%%s4NQA

Gene location (Human)
Chr.	Chromosome 19 (human)
Band	19q13.33	Start	50,329,653 bp
Band	19q13.33	End	50,383,388 bp

Gene location (Mouse)
Chr.	Chromosome 7 (mouse)
Band	7|7 B3	Start	44,199,040 bp
Band	7|7 B3	End	44,203,375 bp
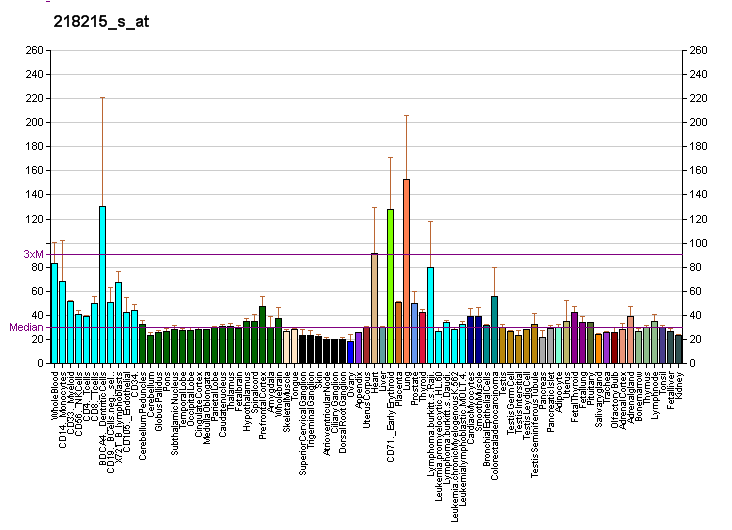
RNA expression pattern
Bgee	Human / Mouse (ortholog); Top expressed in: popliteal artery; tibial arteries; right coronary artery; thoracic aorta; left coronary artery; ascending aorta; Descending thoracic aorta; gastric mucosa; gastrocnemius muscle; muscle of thigh / Top expressed in: granulocyte; neural layer of retina; lip; muscle of thigh; right kidney; superior frontal gyrus; duodenum; thymus; esophagus; ventricular zone; More reference expression data
BioGPS	More reference expression data
Gene ontology
Molecular function	DNA binding; sequence-specific DNA binding; DNA-binding transcription factor activity; ATPase binding; zinc ion binding; DNA-binding transcription activator activity, RNA polymerase II-specific; metal ion binding; retinoid X receptor binding; RNA polymerase II cis-regulatory region sequence-specific DNA binding; steroid hormone receptor activity; apolipoprotein A-I receptor binding; nuclear receptor activity; protein binding; DNA-binding transcription factor activity, RNA polymerase II-specific; transcription cis-regulatory region binding; RNA polymerase II transcription regulatory region sequence-specific DNA binding; transcription factor binding; nuclear receptor coactivator activity; signaling receptor activity
Cellular component	cytoplasm; nucleoplasm; nucleus; RNA polymerase II transcription regulator complex
Biological process	positive regulation of high-density lipoprotein particle assembly; negative regulation of proteolysis; positive regulation of triglyceride biosynthetic process; positive regulation of protein metabolic process; negative regulation of interferon-gamma-mediated signaling pathway; positive regulation of cholesterol transport; regulation of transcription, DNA-templated; cellular lipid metabolic process; regulation of transcription by RNA polymerase II; positive regulation of secretion of lysosomal enzymes; positive regulation of lipid storage; positive regulation of lipoprotein lipase activity; negative regulation of transcription by RNA polymerase II; positive regulation of fatty acid biosynthetic process; negative regulation of gene expression; transcription, DNA-templated; positive regulation of transcription, DNA-templated; negative regulation of cholesterol storage; negative regulation of pinocytosis; positive regulation of gene expression; retinoic acid receptor signaling pathway; positive regulation of cholesterol efflux; positive regulation of pancreatic juice secretion; lipid homeostasis; negative regulation of lipid transport; transcription initiation from RNA polymerase II promoter; negative regulation of transcription, DNA-templated; negative regulation of macrophage derived foam cell differentiation; positive regulation of transcription by RNA polymerase II; steroid hormone mediated signaling pathway; cholesterol homeostasis; lipid metabolism; multicellular organism development; cell differentiation; cellular response to lipopolysaccharide; negative regulation of cold-induced thermogenesis; intracellular receptor signaling pathway
Sources:Amigo / QuickGO
Orthologs
Databases	NCBI: entry; OMA: entry
Species	Human	Mouse
Entrez	7376	22260
Ensembl	ENSG00000131408	ENSMUSG00000060601
UniProt	P55055	Q60644
RefSeq (mRNA)	NM_007121; NM_001256647	NM_001285517; NM_001285518; NM_001285519; NM_009473
RefSeq (protein)	NP_001243576; NP_009052; NP_009052.3	NP_001272446; NP_001272447; NP_001272448; NP_033499
Location (UCSC)	Chr 19: 50.33 – 50.38 Mb	Chr 7: 44.2 – 44.2 Mb
PubMed search
- Wikidata
View/Edit Human	View/Edit Mouse

Liver X receptor beta (LXR-β) is a member of the nuclear receptor family of transcription factors. LXR-β is encoded by the NR1H2 gene (nuclear receptor subfamily 1, group H, member 2).

== Function ==
The liver X receptors (LXRs) were originally identified as orphan members of the nuclear receptor superfamily because their ligands were unknown. Like other receptors in the family, LXRs heterodimerize with retinoid X receptor and bind to specific response elements (LXREs) characterized by direct repeats separated by 4 nucleotides. Two genes, alpha (LXRA) and beta, are known to encode LXR proteins.

== Structure ==
Crystal structure of human liver X receptor β(LXRβ) forming heterodimer with its partner retinoid X receptor α(RXRα) on its cognate element, an AGGTCA direct repeat spaced by 4 nt shows an extended X-shaped arrangement, with DNA- and ligand-binding domains crossed. The LXRβ core binds DNA via canonical contacts and auxiliary DNA contacts that enhance affinity for the response element.

== Interactions ==
Liver X receptor beta has been shown to interact with NCOA6 and Retinoid X receptor alpha.
