= All-trans-phytoene synthase =

Class of enzymes

Identifiers
- EC no.: 2.5.1.99

Databases
- IntEnz: IntEnz view
- BRENDA: BRENDA entry
- ExPASy: NiceZyme view
- KEGG: KEGG entry
- MetaCyc: metabolic pathway
- PRIAM: profile
- PDB structures: RCSB PDB PDBe PDBsum
Search
- PMC: articles
- PubMed: articles
- NCBI: proteins

All-trans-phytoene synthase (EC 2.5.1.99, prephytoene-diphosphate synthase, phytoene synthetase, PSase, geranylgeranyl-diphosphate geranylgeranyltransferase, 15-trans-phytoene synthase) is an enzyme with systematic name geranylgeranyl-diphosphate:geranylgeranyl-diphosphate geranylgeranyltransferase (all-trans-phytoene forming). This enzyme catalyses the following chemical reaction

2 geranylgeranyl diphosphate $\rightleftharpoons$ all-trans-phytoene + 2 diphosphate (overall reaction)
(1a) 2 geranylgeranyl diphosphate $\rightleftharpoons$ diphosphate + prephytoene diphosphate
(1b) prephytoene diphosphate $\rightleftharpoons$ all-trans-phytoene + diphosphate

This enzyme requires Mn^{2+} for activity.
