= Phytoene synthase =

Class of enzymes

15-cis-phytoene synthase

Identifiers
- EC no.: 2.5.1.32
- CAS no.: 50936-61-3

Databases
- IntEnz: IntEnz view
- BRENDA: BRENDA entry
- ExPASy: NiceZyme view
- KEGG: KEGG entry
- MetaCyc: metabolic pathway
- PRIAM: profile
- PDB structures: RCSB PDB PDBe PDBsum
Search
- PMC: articles
- PubMed: articles
- NCBI: proteins

Phytoene synthase (EC 2.5.1.32, prephytoene-diphosphate synthase, 15-cis-phytoene synthase, PSase, geranylgeranyl-diphosphate geranylgeranyltransferase) is a transferase enzyme involved in the biosynthesis of carotenoids. It catalyzes the conversion of geranylgeranyl pyrophosphate to phytoene. This enzyme catalyses the following chemical reaction

2 geranylgeranyl diphosphate $\rightleftharpoons$ 15-cis-phytoene + 2 diphosphate (overall reaction)
(1a) 2 geranylgeranyl diphosphate $\rightleftharpoons$ diphosphate + prephytoene diphosphate
(1b) prephytoene diphosphate $\rightleftharpoons$ 15-cis-phytoene + diphosphate

This enzyme requires Mn^{2+} for activity. It belongs to squalene/phytoene synthase family of proteins.
