= Pregnenolone (medication) =

Medication and supplement

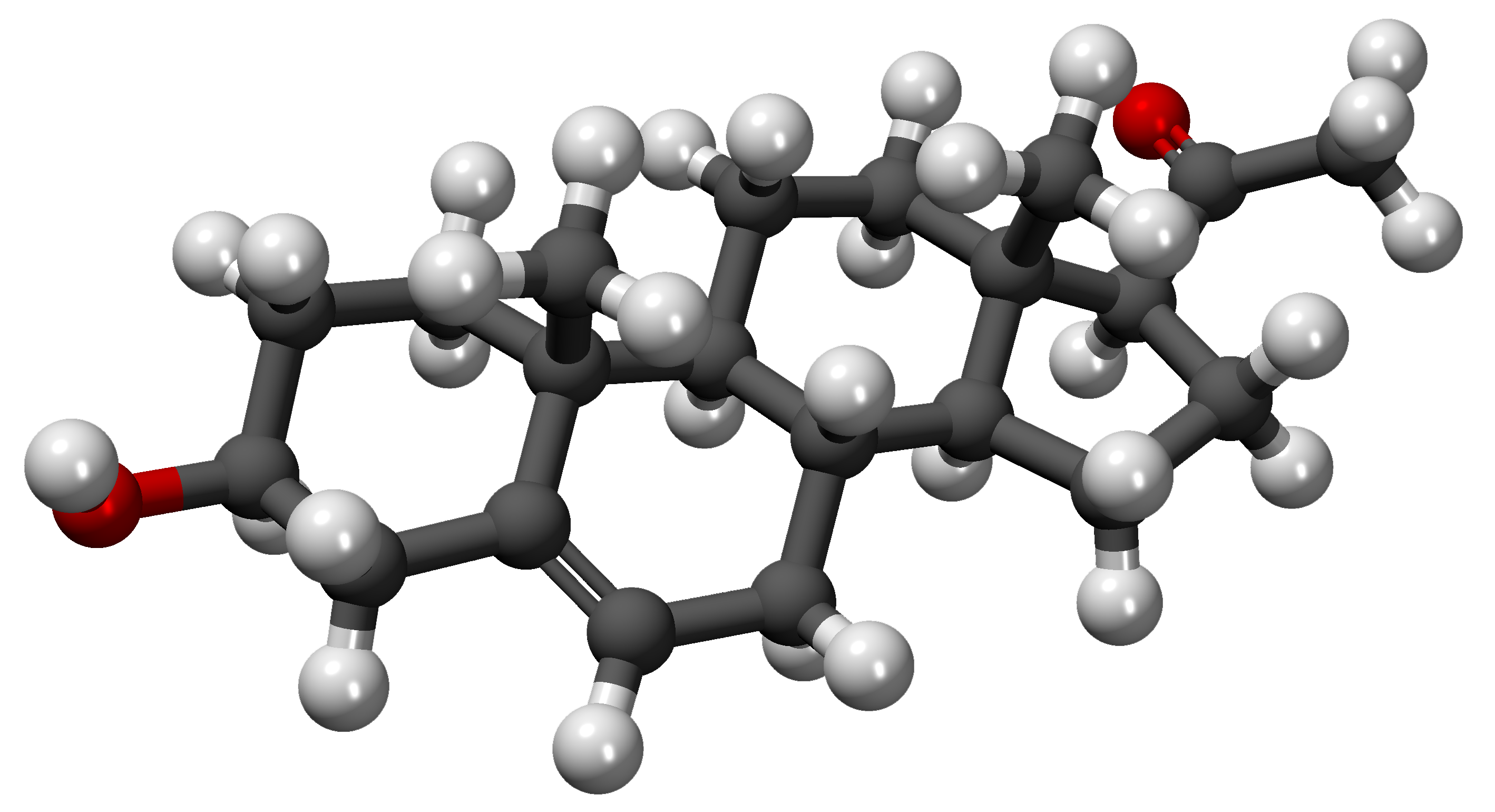

Clinical data
- Trade names: Arthenolone, Bina-Skin, Enelone, Natolone, Pregneton, Prenolone, Regnosone, Sharmone, Skinostelon
- Other names: P5; 5-Pregnenolone; δ^{5}-Pregnene-3β-ol-20-one; Pregn-5-en-3β-ol-20-one; NSC-1616
- AHFS/Drugs.com: International Drug Names
- Routes of administration: By mouth, transdermal
- Drug class: Neurosteroid; Anti-inflammatory
- ATC code: None

Legal status
- Legal status: In general: Over-the-counter (OTC)

Identifiers
- IUPAC name: 1-[(3S,8S,9S,10R,13S,14S,17S)-3-hydroxy-10,13-dimethyl-2,3,4,7,8,9,11,12,14,15,16,17-dodecahydro-1H-cyclopenta[a]phenanthren-17-yl]ethanone
- CAS Number: 145-13-1
- PubChem CID: 8955
- IUPHAR/BPS: 2376
- DrugBank: DB02789
- ChemSpider: 8611
- UNII: 73R90F7MQ8
- KEGG: D00143
- ChEBI: CHEBI:16581
- ChEMBL: ChEMBL253363

Chemical and physical data
- Formula: C_{21}H_{32}O_{2}
- Molar mass: 316.485 g·mol^{−1}
- 3D model (JSmol): Interactive image
- SMILES: CC(=O)[C@H]1CC[C@@H]2[C@@]1(CC[C@H]3[C@H]2CC=C4[C@@]3(CC[C@@H](C4)O)C)C
- InChI: InChI=1S/C21H32O2/c1-13(22)17-6-7-18-16-5-4-14-12-15(23)8-10-20(14,2)19(16)9-11-21(17,18)3/h4,15-19,23H,5-12H2,1-3H3/t15-,16-,17+,18-,19-,20-,21+/m0/s1; Key:ORNBQBCIOKFOEO-QGVNFLHTSA-N

Pregnenolone, sold under the brand name Enelone among others, is a medication and supplement as well as a naturally occurring and endogenous steroid. It is described as a neurosteroid and anti-inflammatory drug and was used in the treatment of rheumatoid arthritis and soft-tissue rheumatism in the 1950s and is no longer prescribed today, but remains available as a supplement. Pregnenolone can be taken by mouth, as a topical medication, or by injection into muscle.

Pregnenolone is promoted online with false claims that it can treat a variety of health conditions including cancer, arthritis and multiple sclerosis.

== Medical uses ==
Pregnenolone was approved for use as a pharmaceutical medication in the treatment of rheumatoid arthritis and soft-tissue rheumatism in the 1950s. It is no longer used today.

=== Available forms ===
Pregnenolone acetate was available as Enelone in the form of 100 mg oral tablets and as a 100 mg/mL crystalline aqueous suspension in 10 mL vials.

== Pharmacology ==
Pregnenolone is a neurosteroid. It is a negative allosteric modulator of the CB_{1} receptor, a ligand of the microtubule-associated protein 2 (MAP2), and an agonist of the pregnane X receptor. Pregnenolone has no progestogenic, corticosteroid, estrogenic, androgenic, or antiandrogenic activity. In addition to its own activities, pregnenolone is a precursor for other neurosteroids such as pregnenolone sulfate, allopregnanolone, and pregnanolone and for steroid hormones.

Pregnenolone has low bioavailability and is subject to high metabolism. Oral administration of 50 or 100 mg pregnenolone has been found to have minimal or negligible effect on urinary levels of testosterone and testosterone metabolites, including of androsterone, etiocholanolone, 5β-androstanediol, androstadienol, and androstenol (and/or their conjugates), and this suggests that only a small amount of pregnenolone is converted into testosterone. This is in accordance with findings on the conversion of DHEA into testosterone, in which only 1.5% of an oral dose of DHEA was found to be converted into testosterone. In contrast to the androstanes, 50 or 100 mg oral pregnenolone has been found to significantly and in fact "strongly" increase urinary levels of the progesterone metabolites pregnanediol and pregnanolone (and/or their conjugates), whereas pregnanetriol was unaffected. Unlike the case of oral administration, transdermal administration of 30 mg/day pregnenolone cream has not been found to affect urinary levels of metabolites of any other steroids, including of progesterone. Intranasal administration of pregnenolone was found to have low bioavailability of around 23%.

Sripada et al. reported that oral pregnenolone is preferentially metabolized into the neurosteroid allopregnanolone rather than into other steroids such as DHEA or cortisol. In further research by their group, a single 400 mg dose of oral pregnenolone at 3 hours post-administration was found to result in a 3-fold elevation in serum levels of pregnenolone and a 7-fold increase in allopregnanolone levels. Pregnanolone levels increased by approximately 60%, while DHEA levels decreased non-significantly by approximately 5% and cortisol levels were not affected. Another study found that allopregnanolone levels were increased by 3-fold at 2 hours post-administration following a single 400 mg oral dose of pregnenolone.

In addition to allopregnanolone, pregnenolone acts as a prodrug of pregnenolone sulfate. However, pregnenolone sulfate does not cross the blood–brain barrier.

== Chemistry ==
Pregnenolone, also known as 5-pregnenolone or as pregn-5-en-3β-ol-20-one, is a naturally occurring pregnane steroid and a derivative of cholesterol. Related steroids include pregnenolone sulfate, 3β-dihydroprogesterone (4-pregnenolone), progesterone, allopregnanolone, and pregnanolone.

=== Derivatives ===
A few synthetic ester derivatives of pregnenolone exist. These include pregnenolone acetate (Antofin, Previsone, Pregno-Pan) and pregnenolone succinate (Panzalone, Formula 405). Prebediolone acetate (Acetoxanon, Acetoxy-Prenolon, Artisone, Artivis, Pregnartrone, Sterosone), the 21-acetate ester of 21-hydroxypregnenolone, also exists. These esters are all described as glucocorticoids similarly to pregnenolone.

The 3β-methyl ether of pregnenolone, 3β-methoxypregnenolone (MAP-4343), retains similar activity to pregnenolone in regard to interaction with MAP2, and is under development for potential clinical use for indications such as the treatment of brain and spinal cord injury and depressive disorders.

== History ==
Pregnenolone was first synthesized by Adolf Butenandt and colleagues in 1934. It was first used in medicine, as an anti-inflammatory medication, in the 1940s.

== Society and culture ==
=== Generic names ===
Pregnenolone is the generic name of the drug and its INN, BAN, DCF, and JAN.

=== Brand names ===
Pregnenolone has been marketed in the past under a variety of brand names including Arthenolone, Bina-Skin, Enelone, Natolone, Pregnetan, Pregneton, Pregnolon, Prenolon, Prenolone, Regnosone, Sharmone, and Skinostelon.

=== Availability ===
Pregnenolone is no longer marketed as a medication, but remains available as a supplement.

== Alternative medicine ==
Pregnenolone has been promoted online with claims it can treat a variety of diseases including multiple sclerosis, arthritis, and cancer, but such claims are not backed by evidence.

== Research ==
As of 2016 pregnenolone is being researched for possible therapeutic applications, but its poor bioavailability makes its prospects for usefulness low. Pregnenolone is available as an over-the-counter supplement, for instance in the United States.

== See also ==
- List of unproven and disproven cancer treatments
