= C27H46O2 =

The molecular formula C_{27}H_{46}O_{2} may refer to:

- Hydroxycholesterols
  - 7α-Hydroxycholesterol
  - 22R-Hydroxycholesterol(22(R)-Hydroxycholesterol)
  - Cerebrosterol (24(S)-Hydroxycholesterol)
  - 25-Hydroxycholesterol
  - 27-Hydroxycholesterol
- Oxycholesterol
- δ-Tocopherol
