= Hydroxycholesterol =

Hydroxycholesterol may refer to:

- 7α-Hydroxycholesterol
- 20S-Hydroxycholesterol
- 22R-Hydroxycholesterol (22(R)-Hydroxycholesterol)
- Cerebrosterol (24(S)-Hydroxycholesterol)
- 25-Hydroxycholesterol
- 27-Hydroxycholesterol
