= C21H36 =

The molecular formula C_{21}H_{36} (molar mass: 288.52 g/mol, exact mass: 288.2817 u) may refer to:

- Allopregnane, or 5α-Pregnane
- Pregnane, also known as 17β-ethylandrostane
- 5β-Pregnane
