= Pregnenolone succinate =

Chemical compound

Clinical data
- Trade names: Panzalone, Formula 405
- Other names: Pregnenolone hemisuccinate; Pregn-5-en-3β-ol-20-one 3β-(hydrogen succinate)
- Routes of administration: Topical

Identifiers
- IUPAC name: 4-[[(3S,8S,9S,10R,13S,14S,17S)-17-Acetyl-10,13-dimethyl-2,3,4,7,8,9,11,12,14,15,16,17-dodecahydro-1H-cyclopenta[a]phenanthren-3-yl]oxy]-4-oxobutanoic acid
- CAS Number: 4598-67-8
- PubChem CID: 10070529
- ChemSpider: 8246069
- UNII: 6LN4W6JJK6
- KEGG: D05604
- ChEMBL: ChEMBL2105373
- CompTox Dashboard (EPA): DTXSID40196673
- ECHA InfoCard: 100.022.728

Chemical and physical data
- Formula: C_{25}H_{36}O_{5}
- Molar mass: 416.558 g·mol^{−1}
- 3D model (JSmol): Interactive image
- SMILES: CC(=O)[C@H]1CC[C@@H]2[C@@]1(CC[C@H]3[C@H]2CC=C4[C@@]3(CC[C@@H](C4)OC(=O)CCC(=O)O)C)C
- InChI: InChI=1S/C25H36O5/c1-15(26)19-6-7-20-18-5-4-16-14-17(30-23(29)9-8-22(27)28)10-12-24(16,2)21(18)11-13-25(19,20)3/h4,17-21H,5-14H2,1-3H3,(H,27,28)/t17-,18-,19+,20-,21-,24-,25+/m0/s1; Key:OZZAYJQNMKMUSD-DMISRAGPSA-N

Pregnenolone succinate (USAN; brand names Panzalone, Formula 405; also known as pregnenolone hemisuccinate or pregn-5-en-3β-ol-20-one 3β-(hydrogen succinate)) is a synthetic pregnane steroid and an ester of pregnenolone which is described as a glucocorticoid and anti-inflammatory drug and has been patented and marketed as a topical medication in the form of a cream for the treatment of allergic, pruritic, and inflammatory dermatitis. It has also been described as a non-hormonal sterol, having neurosteroid activity, and forming a progesterone analogue via dehydrogenation.

In addition to its glucocorticoid effects, pregnenolone succinate has been found to act as a negative allosteric modulator of the GABA_{A} receptor and a positive allosteric modulator of the NMDA receptor similarly to pregnenolone sulfate.

== See also ==
- Pregnenolone acetate
- Prebediolone acetate
