= Pregnenolone acetate =

Chemical compound

Clinical data
- Trade names: Antofin, Previsone, Pregno-Pan
- Other names: Pregn-5-en-3β-ol-20-one 3β-acetate, Antofin, Artivis, Enescorb, Previsone, Sharmone, Pregnenolone-3-acetate, 1778-02-5, 3α-Acetoxy-5-pregnen-20-one, ZINC6304690, NSC 64827, Acetic acid 20-oxopregn-5-en-3alpha-yl ester
- Routes of administration: Topical

Identifiers
- IUPAC name: [(3S,8S,9S,10R,13S,14S,17S)-17-Acetyl-10,13-dimethyl-2,3,4,7,8,9,11,12,14,15,16,17-dodecahydro-1H-cyclopenta[a]phenanthren-3-yl] acetate
- CAS Number: 1778-02-5
- PubChem CID: 2723722
- DrugBank: DB14626
- ChemSpider: 2005918
- UNII: 0G0WWV404B
- KEGG: C14658
- ChEBI: CHEBI:34930
- ChEMBL: ChEMBL1892286
- CompTox Dashboard (EPA): DTXSID3048942
- ECHA InfoCard: 100.015.648

Chemical and physical data
- Formula: C_{23}H_{34}O_{3}
- Molar mass: 358.522 g·mol^{−1}
- 3D model (JSmol): Interactive image
- SMILES: CC(=O)[C@H]1CC[C@@H]2[C@@]1(CC[C@H]3[C@H]2CC=C4[C@@]3(CC[C@@H](C4)OC(=O)C)C)C
- InChI: InChI=1S/C23H34O3/c1-14(24)19-7-8-20-18-6-5-16-13-17(26-15(2)25)9-11-22(16,3)21(18)10-12-23(19,20)4/h5,17-21H,6-13H2,1-4H3/t17-,18-,19+,20-,21-,22-,23+/m0/s1; Key:CRRKVZVYZQXICQ-RJJCNJEVSA-N

Pregnenolone acetate (brand names Antofin, Previsone, Pregno-Pan), also known as pregn-5-en-3β-ol-20-one 3β-acetate, is a synthetic pregnane steroid and an ester of pregnenolone which is described as a glucocorticoid and as a skin-conditioning and skin anti-aging agent. It has been reported to reduce wrinkles in elderly women when applied in the form of a 0.5% topical cream, effects which were suggested to be due to improved hydration of the skin. Pregnenolone acetate has been marketed in France in a topical cream containing 1% pregnenolone acetate and 10% "sex hormone" for the treatment of premature skin aging but was withdrawn from the market in 1992. Although the medication has been described by some sources as a glucocorticoid, other authors have stated that systemic pregnenolone acetate has no undesirable metabolic or toxic effects even at high doses.

== See also ==
- Pregnenolone succinate
- Prebediolone acetate
