= 21-Hydroxypregnenolone =

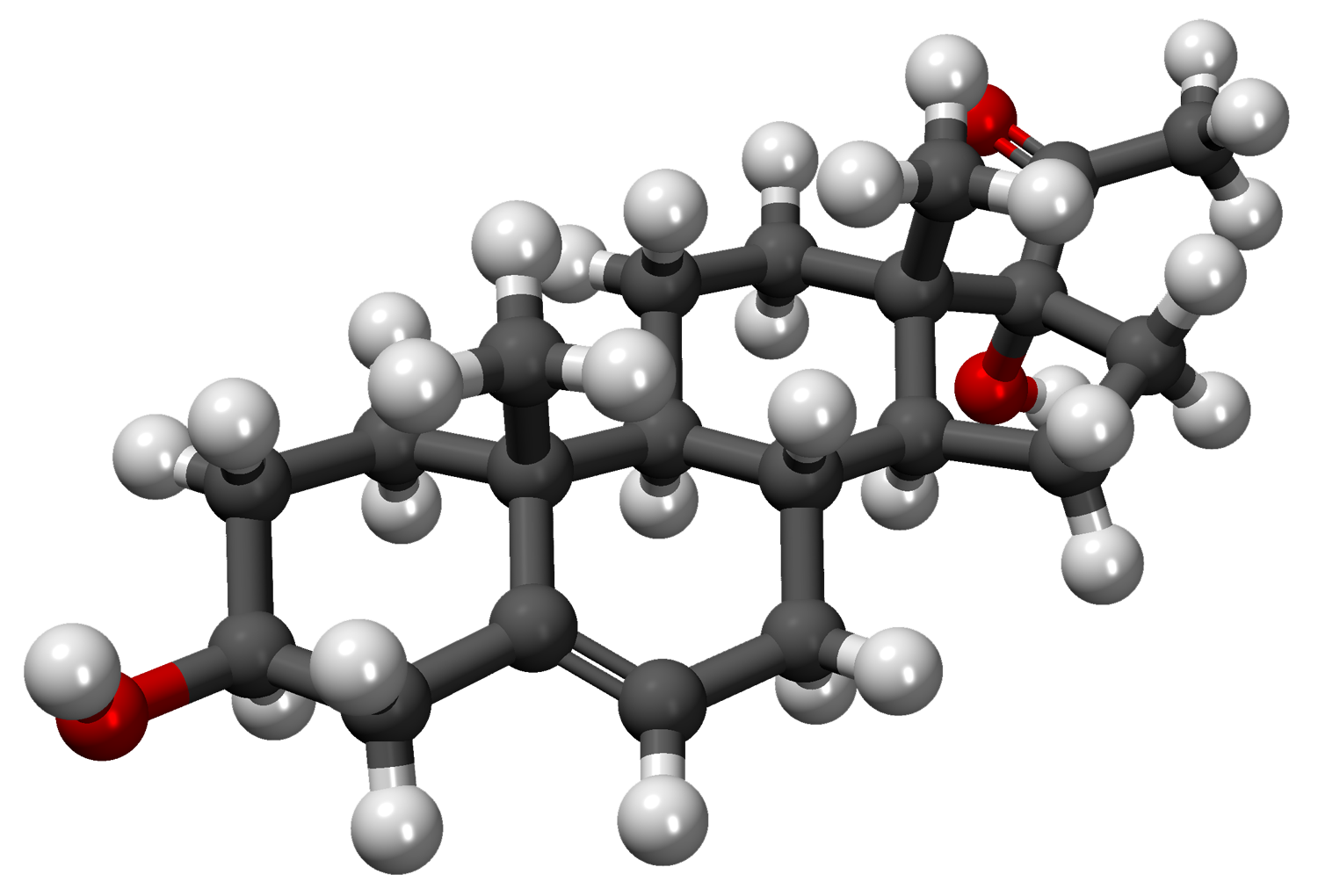

Names
- IUPAC name 3β,21-Dihydroxypregn-5-en-20-one
- Systematic IUPAC name 2-Hydroxy-1-[(1S,3aS,3bS,7S,9aR,9bS,11aS)-7-hydroxy-9a,11a-dimethyl-2,3,3a,3b,4,6,7,8,9,9a,9b,10,11,11a-tetradecahydro-1H-cyclopenta[a]phenanthren-1-yl]ethan-1-one
- Other names Prebediolone; Pregn-5-en-3β,21-diol-20-one

Identifiers
CAS Number	1164-98-3
3D model (JSmol)	Interactive image
ChEBI	CHEBI:28043
ChEMBL	ChEMBL1908012
ChemSpider	216208
PubChem CID	247020
UNII	A1L3K6161X
CompTox Dashboard (EPA)	DTXSID301314382
- InChI: InChI=1S/C21H32O3/c1-20-9-7-14(23)11-13(20)3-4-15-16-5-6-18(19(24)12-22)21(16,2)10-8-17(15)20/h3,14-18,22-23H,4-12H2,1-2H3/t14-,15-,16-,17-,18+,20-,21-/m0/s1 Key: MOIQRAOBRXUWGN-WPWXJNKXSA-N
- SMILES: C[C@]12CC[C@H]3[C@H]([C@@H]1CC[C@@H]2C(=O)CO)CC=C4[C@@]3(CC[C@@H](C4)O)C

Properties
Chemical formula	C_{21}H_{32}O_{3}
Molar mass	332.484 g·mol^{−1}
- Except where otherwise noted, data are given for materials in their standard state (at 25 °C [77 °F], 100 kPa). Infobox references

21-Hydroxypregnenolone, also known as prebediolone, as well as 3β,21-dihydroxypregn-5-en-20-one, is a naturally occurring and endogenous pregnane steroid, and an intermediate in the biosynthesis of 11-deoxycorticosterone (21-hydroxyprogesterone), corticosterone (11β,21-dihydroxyprogesterone), and other corticosteroids. It is formed from pregnenolone in the adrenal glands.

The 21-acetate ester of 21-hydroxypregnenolone, prebediolone acetate, is described as a glucocorticoid and has been used in the treatment of rheumatoid arthritis.

== See also ==
- 17α-Hydroxypregnenolone
- Progesterone
- 17α-Hydroxyprogesterone
