= Cholesterol 7alpha-monooxygenase =

Enzyme

cholesterol 7-alpha-monooxygenase

Identifiers
- EC no.: 1.14.13.17
- CAS no.: 9037-53-0

Databases
- IntEnz: IntEnz view
- BRENDA: BRENDA entry
- ExPASy: NiceZyme view
- KEGG: KEGG entry
- MetaCyc: metabolic pathway
- PRIAM: profile
- PDB structures: RCSB PDB PDBe PDBsum
- Gene Ontology: AmiGO / QuickGO
Search
- PMC: articles
- PubMed: articles
- NCBI: proteins

In enzymology, a cholesterol 7alpha-monooxygenase (EC 1.14.13.17) is an enzyme that catalyzes the chemical reaction

cholesterol + NADPH + H^{+} + O_{2} $\rightleftharpoons$ 7alpha-hydroxycholesterol + NADP^{+} + H_{2}O

The 4 substrates of this enzyme are cholesterol, NADPH, H^{+}, and O_{2}, whereas its 3 products are 7-alpha-hydroxycholesterol, NADP^{+}, and H_{2}O.

This enzyme belongs to the family of oxidoreductases, specifically those acting on paired donors, with O2 as oxidant and incorporation or reduction of oxygen. The oxygen incorporated need not be derived from O2 with NADH or NADPH as one donor, and incorporation of one atom o oxygen into the other donor. The systematic name of this enzyme class is cholesterol,NADPH:oxygen oxidoreductase (7alpha-hydroxylating). Other names in common use include cholesterol 7alpha-hydroxylase, and CYP7A1. This enzyme participates in bile acid biosynthesis and ppar signaling pathway. It employs one cofactor, heme.
