= Prebediolone acetate =

Chemical compound

Clinical data
- Trade names: Acetoxanon, Acetoxanone, Acetoxy-Prenolon, Artisone, Artivis, Pregnartrone, Sterosone
- Other names: 21-Hydroxypregnenolone 21-acetate; Pregnenolone 21-acetate; 21-Acetoxypregnenolone; A.O.P.; 3β,21-Dihydroxypregn-5-en-20-one 21-acetate; Pregn-5-en-3β,21-diol-20-one 21-acetate

Identifiers
- IUPAC name: [2-[(3S,8S,9S,10R,13S,14S,17S)-3-Hydroxy-10,13-dimethyl-2,3,4,7,8,9,11,12,14,15,16,17-dodecahydro-1H-cyclopenta[a]phenanthren-17-yl]-2-oxoethyl] acetate
- CAS Number: 566-78-9
- PubChem CID: 248856
- ChemSpider: 217884
- UNII: DX3XOD2S6B
- ChEMBL: ChEMBL1328310
- CompTox Dashboard (EPA): DTXSID60878641
- ECHA InfoCard: 100.008.454

Chemical and physical data
- Formula: C_{23}H_{34}O_{4}
- Molar mass: 374.521 g·mol^{−1}
- 3D model (JSmol): Interactive image
- SMILES: CC(=O)OCC(=O)[C@H]1CC[C@@H]2[C@@]1(CC[C@H]3[C@H]2CC=C4[C@@]3(CC[C@@H](C4)O)C)C
- InChI: InChI=1S/C23H34O4/c1-14(24)27-13-21(26)20-7-6-18-17-5-4-15-12-16(25)8-10-22(15,2)19(17)9-11-23(18,20)3/h4,16-20,25H,5-13H2,1-3H3/t16-,17-,18-,19-,20+,22-,23-/m0/s1; Key:MDJRZSNPHZEMJH-MTMZYOSNSA-N

Prebediolone acetate (brand names Acetoxanon, Acetoxanone, Acetoxy-Prenolon, Artisone, Artivis, Pregnartrone, Sterosone), also known as 21-hydroxypregnenolone 21-acetate or 21-acetoxypregnenolone (A.O.P.), as well as 3β,21-dihydroxypregn-5-en-20-one 21-acetate, is a synthetic pregnane steroid which is described as a glucocorticoid and has been used in the treatment of rheumatoid arthritis. It is the C21 acetate ester of prebediolone (21-hydroxypregnenolone), the C21 hydroxylated derivative of pregnenolone. Prebediolone acetate has been known since at least 1950. The compound is also an intermediate in a synthesis of deoxycorticosterone acetate (21-acetoxyprogesterone).

== See also ==
- Pregnenolone acetate
- Pregnenolone succinate
