= C21H21N3O2 =

The molecular formula C_{21}H_{21}N_{3}O_{2} (molar mass: 347.418 g/mol) may refer to:

- CIM-0216
- Compound 9 (opioid antagonist)
