= 27-hydroxycholesterol 7alpha-monooxygenase =

Class of enzymes

27-hydroxycholesterol 7-alpha-monooxygenase

Identifiers
- EC no.: 1.14.13.60
- CAS no.: 149316-80-3

Databases
- IntEnz: IntEnz view
- BRENDA: BRENDA entry
- ExPASy: NiceZyme view
- KEGG: KEGG entry
- MetaCyc: metabolic pathway
- PRIAM: profile
- PDB structures: RCSB PDB PDBe PDBsum
- Gene Ontology: AmiGO / QuickGO
Search
- PMC: articles
- PubMed: articles
- NCBI: proteins

In enzymology, a 27-hydroxycholesterol 7alpha-monooxygenase (EC 1.14.13.60) is an enzyme that catalyzes the chemical reaction

27-hydroxycholesterol + NADPH + H^{+} + O_{2} $\rightleftharpoons$ 7alpha,27-dihydroxycholesterol + NADP^{+} + H_{2}O

The 4 substrates of this enzyme are 27-hydroxycholesterol, NADPH, H^{+}, and O_{2}, whereas its 3 products are 7alpha,27-dihydroxycholesterol, NADP^{+}, and H_{2}O.

This enzyme belongs to the family of oxidoreductases, specifically those acting on paired donors, with O2 as oxidant and incorporation or reduction of oxygen. The oxygen incorporated need not be derived from O2 with NADH or NADPH as one donor, and incorporation of one atom o oxygen into the other donor. The systematic name of this enzyme class is 27-hydroxycholesterol,NADPH:oxygen oxidoreductase (7alpha-hydroxylating). This enzyme is also called 27-hydroxycholesterol 7alpha-hydroxylase. It employs one cofactor, heme-thiolate(P-450).
