= FEM-1689 =

Chemical compound

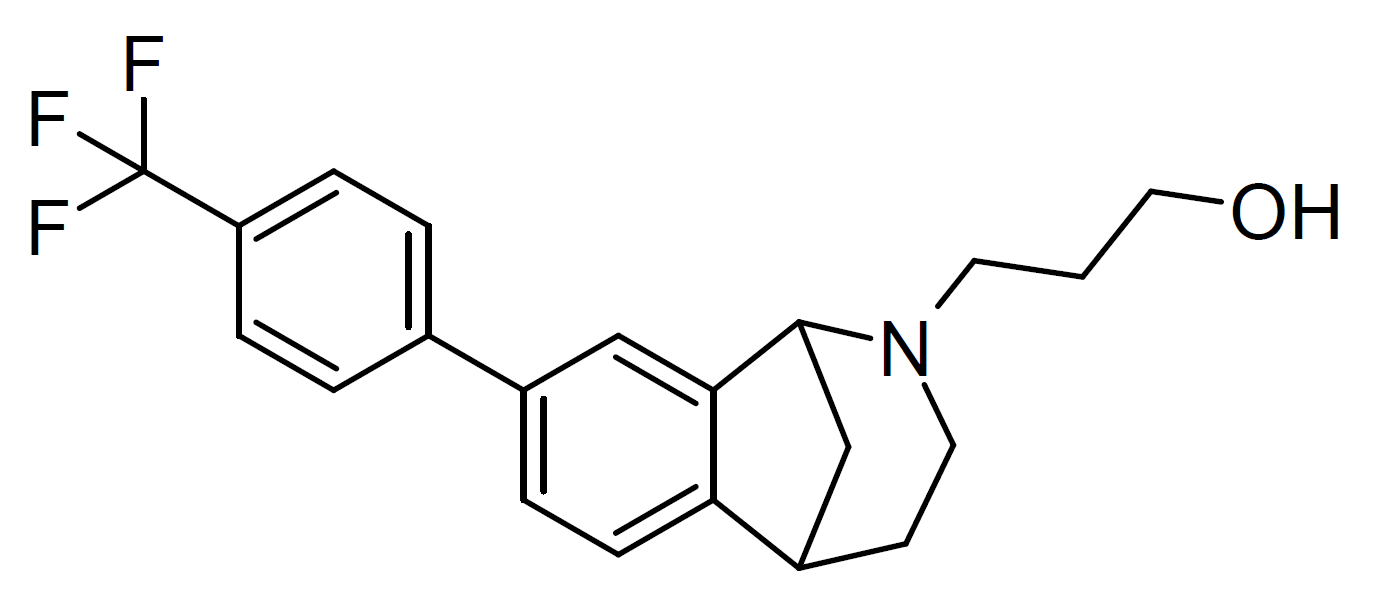

Identifiers
- IUPAC name: 3-[5-[4-(trifluoromethyl)phenyl]-9-azatricyclo[6.3.1.0^{2,7}]dodeca-2(7),3,5-trien-9-yl]propan-1-ol
- CAS Number: 2113664-14-3
- PubChem CID: 123821136

Chemical and physical data
- Formula: C_{21}H_{22}F_{3}NO
- Molar mass: 361.408 g·mol^{−1}
- 3D model (JSmol): Interactive image
- SMILES: FC(F)(F)c1ccc(cc1)c1cc2c(cc1)C1CC2N(CC1)CCCO
- InChI: InChI=1S/C21H22F3NO/c22-21(23,24)17-5-2-14(3-6-17)15-4-7-18-16-8-10-25(9-1-11-26)20(13-16)19(18)12-15/h2-7,12,16,20,26H,1,8-11,13H2; Key:DYYGKMZHHOOCGT-UHFFFAOYSA-N

FEM-1689 is a drug which acts as a potent and selective sigma-2 receptor ligand with a binding affinity of 11 nM, and was developed for the treatment of neuropathic pain.
