= Cholesterol 25-hydroxylase =

Class of enzymes

Identifiers
- EC no.: 1.14.99.38

Databases
- BRENDA: enzyme data
- ExPASy: NiceZyme view
- KEGG: enzyme entry
- MetaCyc: metabolic pathway
- Rhea: reactions
- PDB structures: RCSB PDB PDBe PDBsum
Search
- PMC: articles
- PubMed: articles
- NCBI: proteins

Cholesterol 25-hydroxylase

Identifiers
- Symbol: CH25H
- NCBI gene: 9023
- HGNC: 1907
- OMIM: 604551
- RefSeq: NM_003956
- UniProt: O95992

Other data
- Locus: Chr. 10 q23.31
Search for
- Structures: Swiss-model
- Domains: InterPro

Cholesterol 25-hydroxylase (EC 1.14.99.38 that in humans is encoded by the CH25H gene) is an enzyme that catalyzes the chemical reaction

Cholesterol
+ reduced
acceptor
O_{2}
H_{2}O
25-Hydroxycholesterol
+ electron
acceptor

The three substrates of this enzyme are cholesterol, a reduced electron acceptor, and oxygen. Its products are 25-hydroxycholesterol, the electron acceptor, and water.

This enzyme is an oxidoreductase, that uses molecular oxygen as oxidant and contains a di-iron (Fe-O-Fe) cofactor. The systematic name of this enzyme class is cholesterol, hydrogen-donor:oxygen oxidoreductase (25-hydroxylating). It is also called cholesterol 25-monooxygenase.

Transcripts for this enzyme have been identified in macrophages from the testis.
