= Ononetin =

Chemical compound

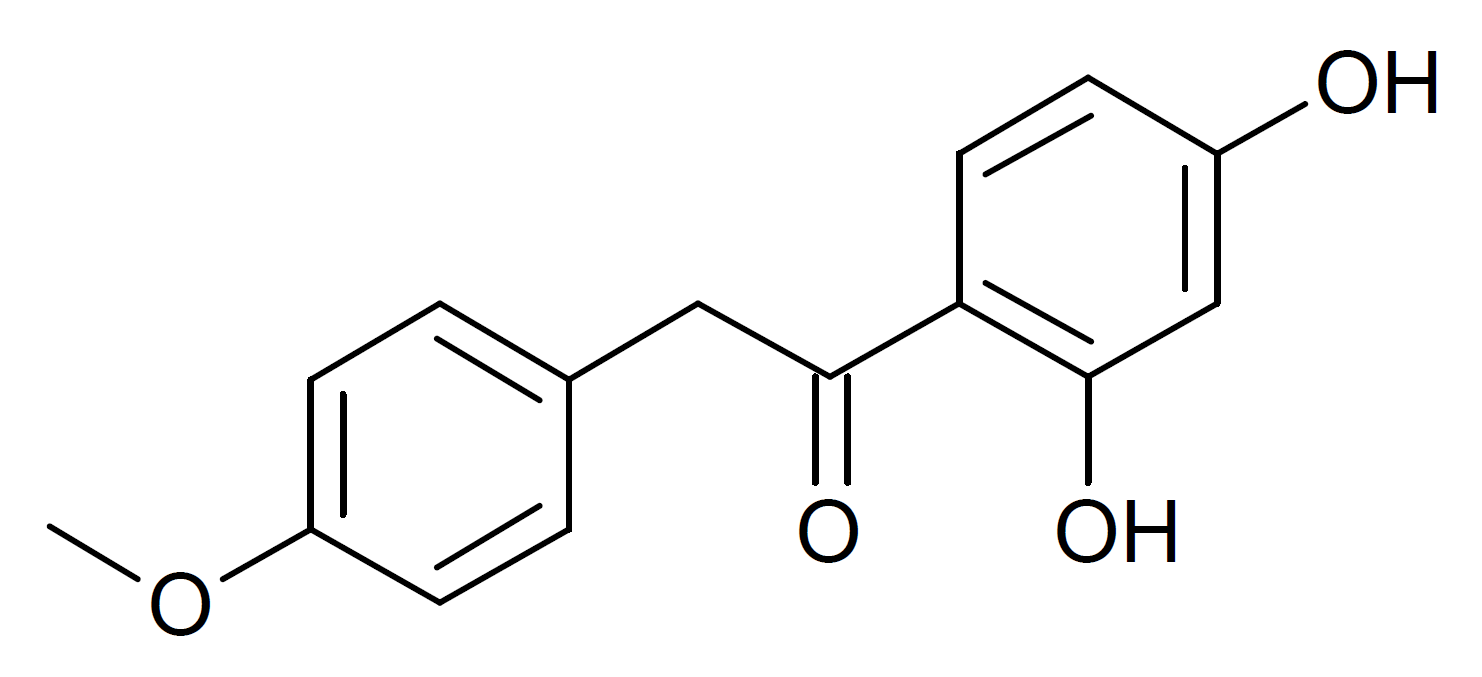

Identifiers
- IUPAC name: 1-(2,4-dihydroxyphenyl)-2-(4-methoxyphenyl)ethanone
- CAS Number: 487-49-0
- PubChem CID: 259632
- ChemSpider: 227880
- UNII: 4S084Z7YS4
- ChEMBL: ChEMBL241858
- CompTox Dashboard (EPA): DTXSID50197590

Chemical and physical data
- Formula: C_{15}H_{14}O_{4}
- Molar mass: 258.273 g·mol^{−1}
- 3D model (JSmol): Interactive image
- SMILES: COC1=CC=C(C=C1)CC(=O)C2=C(C=C(C=C2)O)O
- InChI: InChI=1S/C15H14O4/c1-19-12-5-2-10(3-6-12)8-14(17)13-7-4-11(16)9-15(13)18/h2-7,9,16,18H,8H2,1H3; Key:XHBZOAYMBBUURD-UHFFFAOYSA-N

Ononetin is a natural product from the deoxybenzoin group, which is found in the Russian traditional medicine plant Ononis spinosa. It acts as an inhibitor of the transient receptor potential ion channel TRPM3 and has analgesic effects in animal studies, as well as being used for research into the role of TRPM3 in the immune system dysfunction associated with chronic fatigue syndrome.
