= SAS-1121 =

Compound which binds to the sigma-2 receptor, a cell-membrane protein

SAS-1121 is an organic molecule which binds to a specific protein, the sigma-2 receptor, found in cell membranes. It is highly selective for this over the related sigma-1 receptor. The sigma-2 receptor is significant in cancer and some neurological illnesses.

These two receptors are cell surface receptors: proteins in a cell membrane which pass a signal to the cell when some external molecule binds to them.

SAS-1121 is 280-fold selective for the sigma 2 receptor (K_{i} = 23.8 nM) over the sigma 1 receptor (K_{i} = 6659.6 nM), and served as a tool compound to help identify the sigma 2 receptor as transmembrane 97 (TMEM97).

SAS-1121 is classed as a norbenzomorphan-piperazine.
