= Siramesine =

Chemical compound

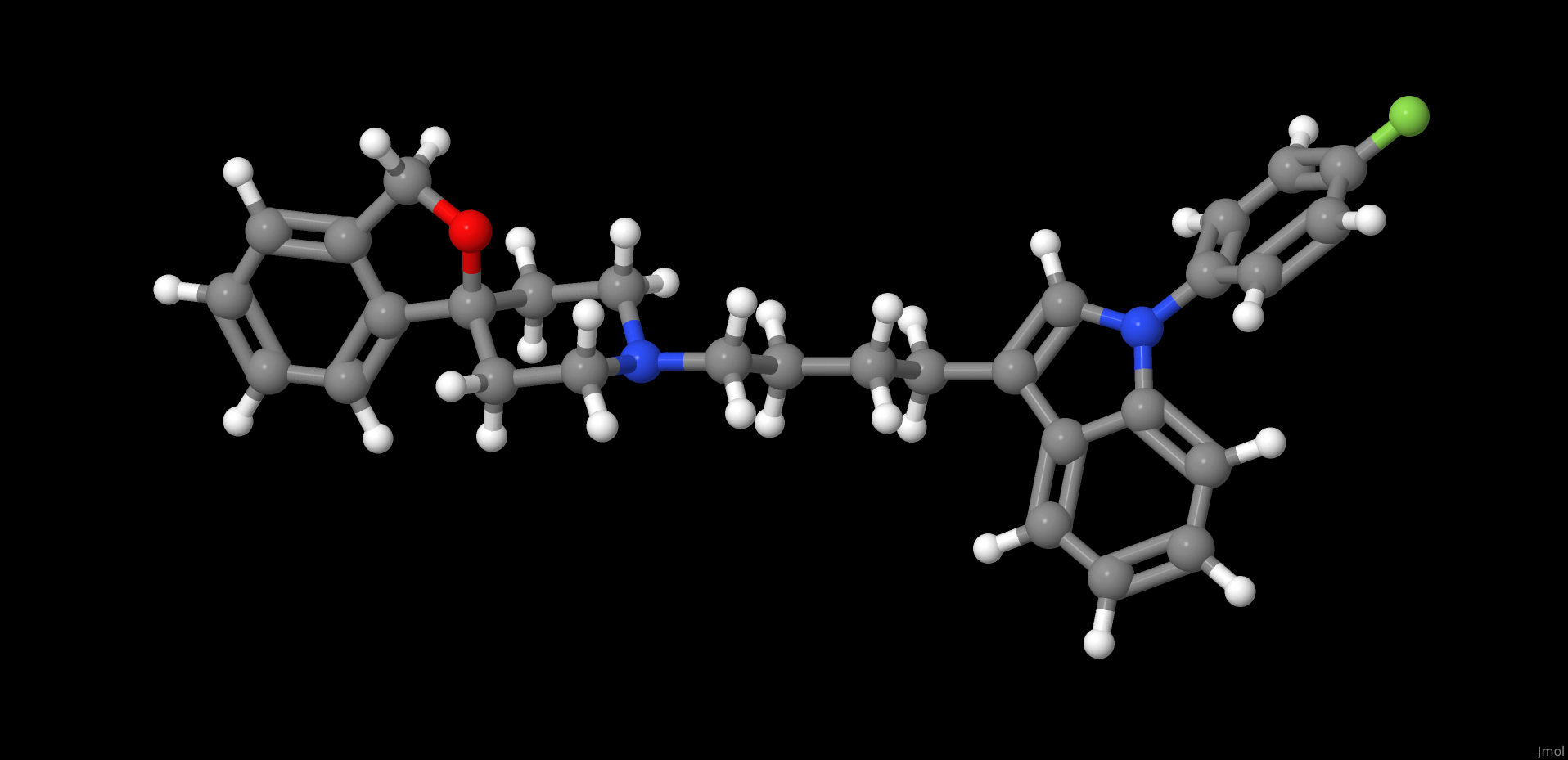

Clinical data
- ATC code: none

Identifiers
- IUPAC name: 1'-{4-[1-(4-Fluorophenyl)-1H-indol-3-yl]butyl}-3H-spiro[2-benzofuran-1,4'-piperidine]
- CAS Number: 147817-50-3
- PubChem CID: 9829526
- DrugBank: DB06555
- ChemSpider: 8005261
- UNII: 3IX8CWR24V
- CompTox Dashboard (EPA): DTXSID90163810

Chemical and physical data
- Formula: C_{30}H_{31}FN_{2}O
- Molar mass: 454.589 g·mol^{−1}
- 3D model (JSmol): Interactive image
- SMILES: C1CN(CCC12C3=CC=CC=C3CO2)CCCCC4=CN(C5=CC=CC=C54)C6=CC=C(C=C6)F
- InChI: InChI=1S/C30H31FN2O/c31-25-12-14-26(15-13-25)33-21-23(27-9-2-4-11-29(27)33)7-5-6-18-32-19-16-30(17-20-32)28-10-3-1-8-24(28)22-34-30/h1-4,8-15,21H,5-7,16-20,22H2; Key:XWAONOGAGZNUSF-UHFFFAOYSA-N

Siramesine (or Lu 28-179) is a sigma receptor agonist, selective for the σ2 subtype. In animal studies, siramesine has been shown to produce anxiolytic and antidepressant effects. It was developed by the pharmaceutical company H Lundbeck for the treatment of anxiety, although development was discontinued after clinical trials showed a lack of efficacy in humans. Siramesine has been shown to produce an enhanced antidepressant effect when co-administered with NMDA antagonists. It has also been used to study the σ2 activity of cocaine, and has been shown to produce anticancer properties both in vitro and in vivo.
