= Pregnadiene =

A pregnadiene is a diene derivative of a pregnane.

Dienes have two double bonds. The first is usually between carbon 4 and carbon 5 on ring A.

== 6-ene ==
The second can be between carbons 6 and 7 on ring B:

Chlormadinone acetate (progestin)

Cyproterone acetate (antiandrogen)

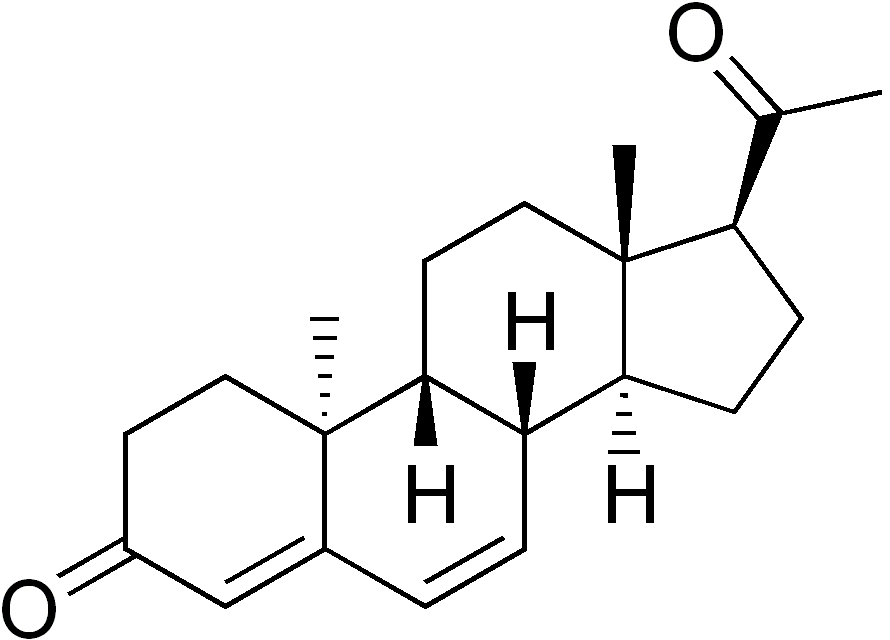
Dydrogesterone (progestin)

Megestrol acetate (progestin, antineoplastic, appetite stimulant)

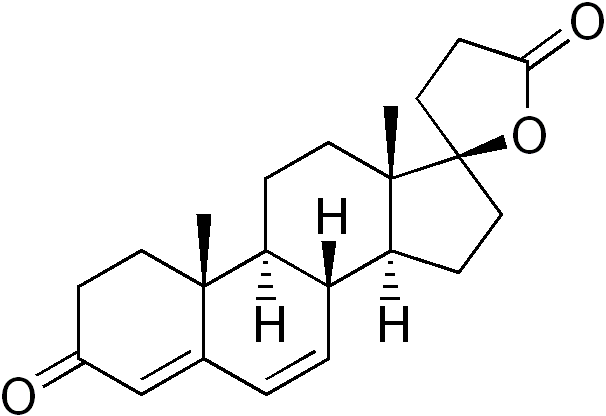
Canrenone (aldosterone antagonist)

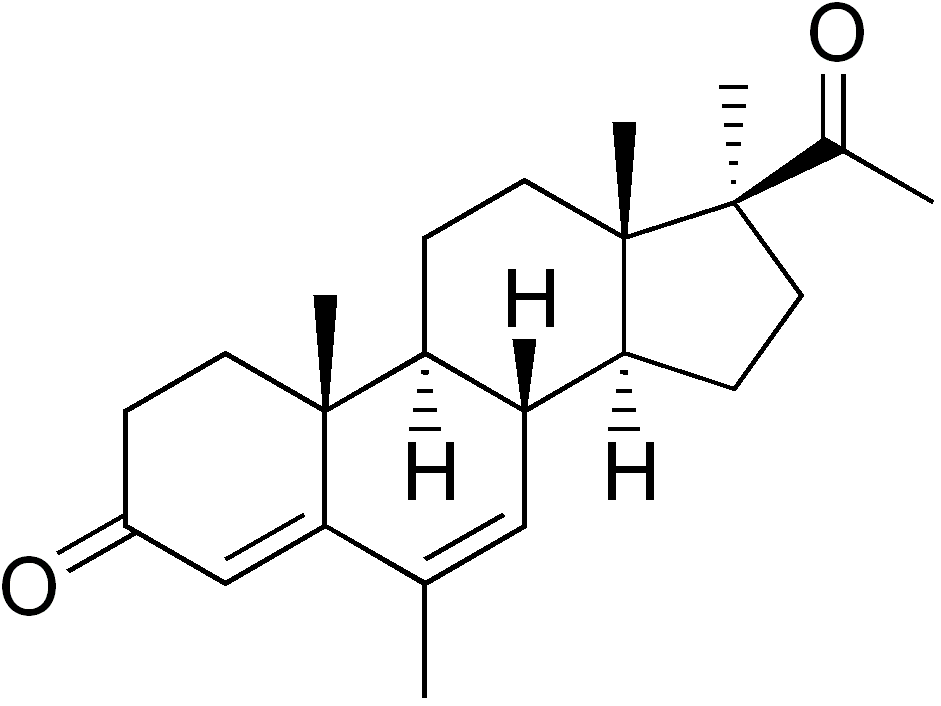
Medrogestone (progestin)

== 1-ene ==
The second can also be between carbons 1 and 2 on ring A:

Fluocinolone acetonide (glucocorticoid)

Triamcinolone (glucocorticoid)
