= Lu 29-252 =

Sigma σ2 receptor ligand

Clinical data
- Other names: Lu-29-252; LU-29252; LU29252; Lu 29–252
- Drug class: Sigma σ_{2} receptor ligand

Identifiers
- IUPAC name: 1'-(4-spiro[1H-2-benzofuran-3,4'-piperidine]-1'-ylbutyl)spiro[1H-2-benzofuran-3,4'-piperidine]
- CAS Number: 154772-66-4
- PubChem CID: 18700226
- PubChem SID: 272800362

Chemical and physical data
- Formula: C_{28}H_{36}N_{2}O_{2}
- Molar mass: 432.608 g·mol^{−1}
- 3D model (JSmol): Interactive image
- SMILES: C1CN(CCC12C3=CC=CC=C3CO2)CCCCN4CCC5(CC4)C6=CC=CC=C6CO5
- InChI: InChI=1S/C28H36N2O2/c1-3-9-25-23(7-1)21-31-27(25)11-17-29(18-12-27)15-5-6-16-30-19-13-28(14-20-30)26-10-4-2-8-24(26)22-32-28/h1-4,7-10H,5-6,11-22H2; Key:AEUZWXWBBOOYMB-UHFFFAOYSA-N

Lu 29-252 is a selective sigma σ_{2} receptor ligand which was under development for the treatment of anxiety disorders but was never marketed. It reached the preclinical stage of development prior to the discontinuation of its development. The drug was under development by Lundbeck.
