= TRPM3-related neurodevelopmental disorder =

Rare disease

- Specialty: Neurology

TRPM3-related neurodevelopmental disorder is a monogenetic developmental and epileptic encephalopathy that affects the central nervous system. The broad phenotype includes global developmental delay, intellectual disability, epilepsy, musculoskeletal anomalies, altered pain perception, ataxia, hypotonia, nystagmus, and cerebellar atrophy.

== Signs and symptoms ==
The earliest sign for TRPM3-related neurodevelopmental disorder is usually congenital hypotonia. Infant feeding issues including dysphagia and gastroesophageal reflux are also reported. Global developmental delay is nearly always present along with mild-to-severe intellectual disability. Epilepsy is reported in 50% of cases.

Other signs of TRPM3-related neurodevelopmental disorder are dysmorphic facial features, scoliosis, hip dysplasia, exotropia, strabismus, nystagmus, ataxia, and altered pain perception.

== Cause ==
TRPM3-related neurodevelopmental disorder is an autosomal dominant genetic disorder. It is caused by missense mutations in the TRPM3 gene. Since the general population has numerous truncating variants and microdeletions throughout TRPM3, the underlying mechanism for neurodevelopmental disorder is not haploinsufficiency.

Research has shown that the disease-associated mutations lead to a gain-of-function. The mutations produce increased basal activity of the TRPM3 ion channel as well as increased response to chemical and noxious heat stimuli. The gain-of-function results in increased intracellular Ca^{2+}. It is possible that this increased channel activity and/or Ca^{2+} induced nerve damage could be the underlying mechanism of the disease.

== Diagnosis ==
Diagnosis is made through genetic testing using an intellectual disability or epilepsy multigene panel that includes TRPM3 or whole exome sequencing. Following identification of a mutation in the TRPM3 gene, alterations in channel activity are evaluated using electrophysiological assays and calcium imaging

== Treatment ==
There is currently no known cure or treatment for TRPM3-related neurodevelopmental disorder. Treatment for individual manifestations of symptoms may follow standard of care (anti-epileptic medication for seizures, physical therapy, occupational therapy, speech therapy, etc).

A single study points to the anti-convulsant drug primidone as an off label therapeutic. Primidone is a known TRPM3 antagonist.

== Prognosis ==
Life span is apparently not impacted by TRPM3-related neurodevelopmental disorder. Not enough data currently exists to understand the disease progression.

== Epidemiology ==
There are currently around 50 reported cases of TRPM3-related neurodevelopmental disorder. It is unknown what the prevalence of this disorder is worldwide.

== Other Resources ==
TRPM3 Foundation
