= Pregnatriene =

Class of chemical compounds

A pregnatriene is a triene derivative of a pregnane.

An example is cortivazol.

== See also ==
- Pregnane
