= Sigma-2 receptor =

Protein-coding gene in the species Homo sapiens

TMEM97
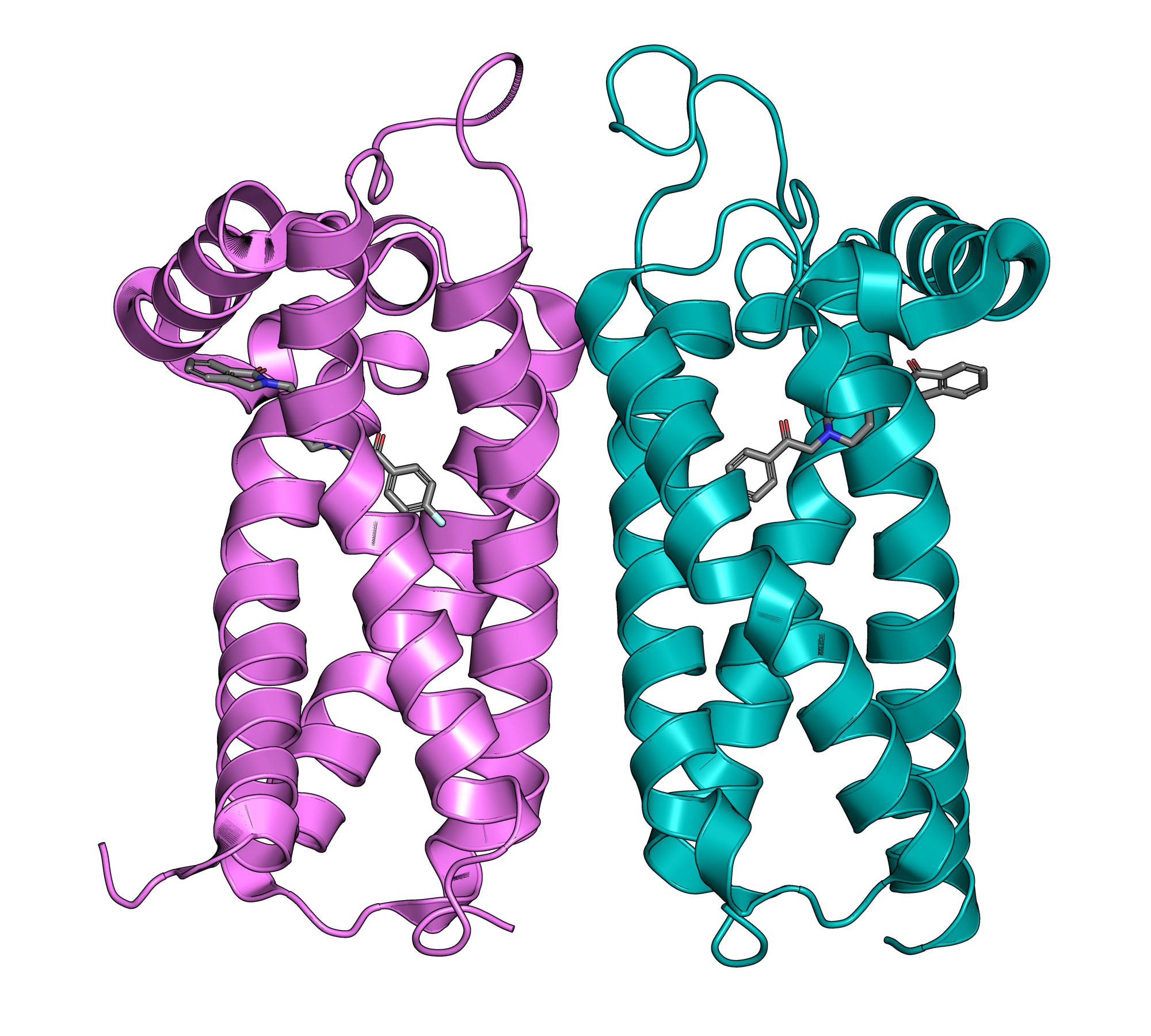

Identifiers
- Aliases: TMEM97, MAC30, transmembrane protein 97, Sigma-2 receptor, sigma2R
- External IDs: OMIM: 612912; MGI: 1916321; GeneCards: TMEM97

Gene location (Human)
Chr.	Chromosome 17 (human)
Band	17q11.2	Start	28,319,200 bp
Band	17q11.2	End	28,328,685 bp

Gene location (Mouse)
Chr.	Chromosome 11 (mouse)
Band	11 B5|11 46.74 cM	Start	78,432,643 bp
Band	11 B5|11 46.74 cM	End	78,441,603 bp
RNA expression pattern
Bgee	Human / Mouse (ortholog); Top expressed in: body of pancreas; secondary oocyte; embryo; pylorus; ganglionic eminence; pons; skin of thigh; liver; pancreatic ductal cell; mucosa of urinary bladder / Top expressed in: spermatocyte; spermatid; yolk sac; testicle; stomach; morula; petrous part of the temporal bone; embryo; epiblast; embryo; More reference expression data
BioGPS	n/a
Gene ontology
Molecular function	protein binding
Cellular component	membrane; integral component of membrane; endoplasmic reticulum; nucleus; nuclear membrane; cytosol; lysosome; rough endoplasmic reticulum; plasma membrane; rough endoplasmic reticulum membrane
Biological process	cholesterol homeostasis; regulation of cell growth
Sources:Amigo / QuickGO
Orthologs
Databases	NCBI: entry; OMA: entry
Species	Human	Mouse
Entrez	27346	69071
Ensembl	ENSG00000109084	ENSMUSG00000037278
UniProt	Q5BJF2	Q8VD00
RefSeq (mRNA)	NM_014573	NM_133706
RefSeq (protein)	NP_055388	NP_598467
Location (UCSC)	Chr 17: 28.32 – 28.33 Mb	Chr 11: 78.43 – 78.44 Mb
PubMed search
- Wikidata
View/Edit Human	View/Edit Mouse

The sigma-2 receptor (σ_{2}R) is a sigma receptor subtype that has attracted attention due to its involvement in diseases such as neurological diseases, neurodegenerative, neuro-ophthalmic and cancer. It is currently under investigation for its potential diagnostic and therapeutic uses.

Although the sigma-2 receptor was identified as a separate pharmacological entity from the sigma-1 receptor in 1990, the gene that codes for the receptor was identified as TMEM97 only in 2017. TMEM97 was shown to regulate the cholesterol transporter NPC1 and to be involved in cholesterol homeostasis. The sigma-2 receptor is a four-pass transmembrane protein located in the endoplasmic reticulum. It has been found to play a role in both hormone signaling and calcium signaling, in neuronal signaling, in cell proliferation and death, and in binding of antipsychotics.

== Classification ==
The sigma-2 receptor is located in the lipid raft. The sigma-2 receptor is found in several areas of the brain, including high densities in the cerebellum, motor cortex, hippocampus, and substantia nigra. It is also highly expressed in the lungs, liver, and kidneys.

== Function ==
The sigma-2 receptor takes part in a number of normal-function roles such as cholesterol homeostasis.

=== Non-neuronal signaling ===
Binding of a number of hormones and steroids, including testosterone, progesterone, and cholesterol, has been found to occur with sigma-2 receptors, though in some cases with lower affinity than to the sigma-1 receptor. Signaling caused by this binding is thought to occur via a calcium secondary messenger and calcium-dependent phosphorylation, and in association with sphingolipids following endoplasmic reticulum release of calcium. Known effects include decrease of expression of effectors in the mTOR pathway, and suppression of cyclin D1 and PARP-1.

=== Neuronal signaling ===
Signaling action in neurons by sigma-2 receptors and their associated ligands results in modulation of action potential firing by regulation of calcium channels and potassium channels. They also are involved in synaptic vesicular release and modulation of dopamine, serotonin, and glutamate, with activation and increase of the dopaminergic, serotonergic, and noradrenergic activity of neurons.

=== Cell proliferation ===
Sigma-2 receptors have been found to be highly expressed in proliferating cells, including tumor cells, and to play a role in the differentiation, morphology, and survival of those cells. By interacting with EGFR membrane proteins sigma-2 receptors play a role in the regulation of signals further downstream such as PKC and RAF. Both PKC and Raf kinase up regulate transcription and cell proliferation.

== Ligands ==
Ligands of the sigma-2 receptor are exogenous and internalized by endocytosis, and can act as either agonists or antagonists. They can typically be classified into four groups, which are structurally related. It is not entirely understood how binding to the sigma-2 receptor occurs. Proposed models commonly include one small and one bulky hydrophobic pocket, electrostatic hydrogen interactions, and less commonly a third hydrophobic pocket.

Class Name	Common compounds
6,7-Dimethoxytetrahydroisoquinoline analogs	RHM-4, [^{18}F]ISO-1, [^{125}I]ISO-2
Tropane and granatane analogs	BIMU-1, FEM-1689, SW107, SW116, SW120
Indole analogs	Siramesine, Ibogaine
Cyclohexylpiperazine analogs	PB28, F281

A study of the four groups has revealed that a basic nitrogen and at least one hydrophobic moiety is needed to bind a sigma-2 receptor. In addition, there are molecular characteristics that increase the selectivity for sigma-2 receptors, which include bulky hydrophobic regions, nitrogen-carboxylic interaction, and additional basic nitrogens.

Since its discovery in 1990, the sigma-2 receptor has been considered an orphan receptor; however, in 2021 20S-hydroxycholesterol was identified as the putative endogenous ligand.

Another ligand is Lu 29-252.

== Diagnostic use ==
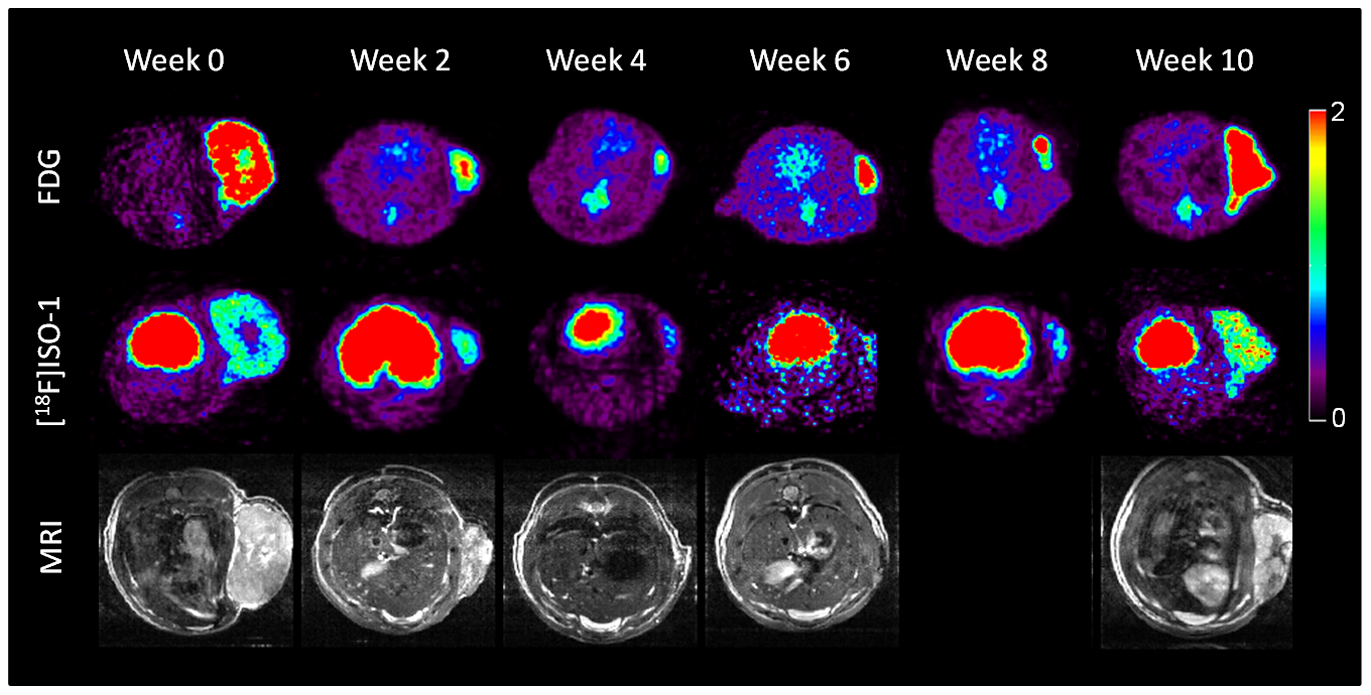
This is a figure shows several different brain imaging scans using [^{18}F]ISO-1 sigma-2 receptor ligands. The scans allow tracking of tumor growth and cancer progression over a 10-week period. The figure also includes MRI scans for comparison with PET scans.

Sigma-2 receptors are highly expressed in breast, ovarian, lung cancers, brain, bladder, colon cancers, and melanoma. This novelty makes them a valuable biomarker for identifying cancerous tissues. Furthermore, studies have shown that they are more highly expressed in malignant tumors than dormant tumors.

Exogenous sigma-2 receptor ligands have been altered to be neuronal-tracers, used to map cells and their connections. These tracers have high selectivity and affinity for sigma-2 receptors, and high lipophilicity, making them ideal for usage in the brain. Because sigma-2 receptors are highly expressed in tumor cells and are part of the cell proliferation mechanism, PET scans using sigma-2 targeted tracers can reveal if a tumor is proliferating and what its growth rate is.

== Therapeutic use ==
=== Neurodegenerative and Neuro-ophthalmic Diseases ===
The sigma-2 receptor is expressed in brain and retinal cells where it regulates key pathways involved in age-related diseases such as Alzheimer's disease and synucleinopathies such as Parkinson's disease and dementia with Lewy bodies, as well as dry age-related macular degeneration (dry AMD). The normal activity of processes regulated by sigma-2, such as protein trafficking and autophagy, is impaired by cellular stresses such as oxidative stress and the build-up of amyloid-β and α-synuclein oligomers. Studies support that sigma-2 modulators can rescue biological processes that are impaired in neurodegenerative diseases.

In vitro studies of experimental sigma-2 receptor modulators demonstrated an ability to prevent the binding of amyloid-β oligomers to neurons and also to displace bound amyloid-β oligomers from neuronal receptors. In addition, transgenic mice treated sigma-2 receptor modulators performed significantly better in the Morris water maze task than did vehicle-treated mice. Taken together, these studies suggest that sigma-2 receptor modulation may be a viable approach for treating certain neurodegenerative diseases of the CNS and retina.

=== Neuropsychiatric ===
Due to the binding capabilities of antipsychotic drugs and various neurotransmitters associated with mood, the sigma-2 receptor is a viable target for therapies related to neuropsychiatric disorders and modulation of emotional response. It is thought to be involved in the pathophysiology of schizophrenia, and sigma-2 receptors have been shown to be less abundant in schizophrenic patients. Additionally, PCP, which is an NMDA antagonist, can induce schizophrenia, while sigma-2 receptor activation has been shown to antagonize effects of PCP, implying antipsychotic capabilities. Sigma receptors are a potential target for treatment of dystonia, given high densities in affected regions of the brain. Anti-ischemics ifenprodil and eliprodil, the binding of which increases blood flow, have also shown affinity to sigma receptors. In experimental trials in mice and rats, the sigma-2 receptor ligand siramesine caused reduced anxiety and displayed antidepressant capabilities, while other studies have shown inhibition of selective sigma receptor radioligands by antidepressants, in the mouse and rat brain.

=== Cancer ===
Sigma-2 receptors have been associated with pancreatic cancer, lung cancer, breast cancer, melanoma, prostate cancer, and ovarian cancer. Tumor cells are shown to over-express sigma-2 receptors, allowing for potential cancer therapies as many sigma-2 receptor mediated cell responses happen only in tumor cells. Tumor cell responses are modulated via ligand binding. Sigma receptor ligands can act as agonists or antagonists, generating different cellular responses. Agonists inhibit tumor cell proliferation and induce apoptosis, which is thought to be triggered by caspase-3 activity. Antagonists promote tumor cell proliferation, but this mechanism is less understood. Sigma receptor ligands have been conjugated to nanoparticles and peptides to deliver cancer treatment to tumor cells without targeting other tissues. The success with these methods have been limited to in vitro trials. Additionally, using sigma-2 receptors to target tumor cells allows for synergizing anti-cancer drug therapies. Some studies have shown that certain sigma receptor inhibitors increase cancer cells' susceptibility to chemotherapy. Other types of binding to sigma-2 receptors increases cytotoxicity of doxorubicin, antinomyocin, and other cancer cell killing drugs.

== See also ==
- Sigma-1 receptor
- Sigma receptor
- SAS-1121, a tool compound preferentially binding to the sigma-2 receptor
