= 20α,22R-Dihydroxycholesterol =

Names
- IUPAC name (22R)-Cholest-5-ene-3β,20,22-triol
- Systematic IUPAC name (2R,3R)-2-[(1S,3aS,3bS,7S,9aR,9bS,11aS)-7-Hydroxy-9a,11a-dimethyl-2,3,3a,3b,4,6,7,8,9,9a,9b,10,11,11a-tetradecahydro-1H-cyclopenta[a]phenanthren-1-yl]-6-methylheptane-2,3-diol

Identifiers
| CAS Number | 596-94-1 |
| 3D model (JSmol) | Interactive image |
| Beilstein Reference | 2339391 |
| ChEBI | CHEBI:1294 |
| ChEMBL | ChEMBL560194 |
| ChemSpider | 4956189 |
| KEGG | C05501 |
| PubChem CID | 6453841 |
| CompTox Dashboard (EPA) | DTXSID00975007 |
- InChI: InChI=1S/C27H46O3/c1-17(2)6-11-24(29)27(5,30)23-10-9-21-20-8-7-18-16-19(28)12-14-25(18,3)22(20)13-15-26(21,23)4/h7,17,19-24,28-30H,6,8-16H2,1-5H3/t19-,20-,21-,22-,23-,24+,25-,26-,27+/m0/s1 Key: ISBSSBGEYIBVTO-TYKWNDPBSA-N
- SMILES: CC(C)CC[C@H]([C@@](C)([C@H]1CC[C@@H]2[C@@]1(CC[C@H]3[C@H]2CC=C4[C@@]3(CC[C@@H](C4)O)C)C)O)O

Properties
| Chemical formula | C_{27}H_{46}O_{3} |
| Molar mass | 418.652 g/mol |
- Except where otherwise noted, data are given for materials in their standard state (at 25 °C [77 °F], 100 kPa). Infobox references

20α,22R-Dihydroxycholesterol, or (3β)-cholest-5-ene-3,20,22-triol is an endogenous, metabolic intermediate in the biosynthesis of the steroid hormones from cholesterol. Cholesterol ((3β)-cholest-5-en-3-ol) is hydroxylated by cholesterol side-chain cleavage enzyme (P450scc) to form 22R-hydroxycholesterol, which is subsequently hydroxylated again by P450scc to form 20α,22R-dihydroxycholesterol, and finally the bond between carbons 20 and 22 is cleaved by P450scc to form pregnenolone ((3β)-3-hydroxypregn-5-en-20-one), the precursor to the steroid hormones.

== See also ==
- 22R-Hydroxycholesterol
- 27-Hydroxycholesterol
