= Pregnene =

A pregnene is an alkene derivative of a pregnane.

An example is cortisone.

Cortisone

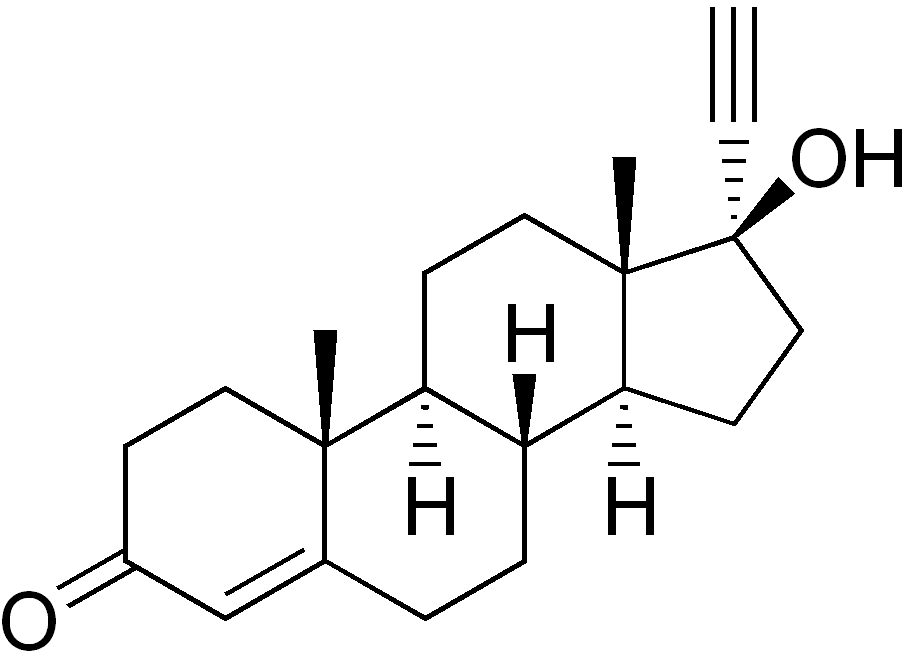
Ethisterone

Spironolactone

== See also ==
- Pregnanes
