= 5β-Pregnane =

Names
- IUPAC name 5β-Pregnane
- Systematic IUPAC name (1S,3aS,3bS,5aS,9aS,9bS,11aR)-1-Ethyl-9a,11a-dimethylhexadecahydro-1H-cyclopenta[a]phenanthrene
- Other names 17β-Ethyletiocholane; 17β-Ethyl-5β-androstane; 10β,13β-Dimethyl-17β-ethyl-5β-gonane

Identifiers
CAS Number	481-26-5
3D model (JSmol)	Interactive image
ChEBI	CHEBI:20674
ChemSpider	388608
ECHA InfoCard	100.164.905
KEGG	C01523
PubChem CID	439513
UNII	10Z78HHV4C
CompTox Dashboard (EPA)	DTXSID80331420
- InChI: InChI=1S/C21H36/c1-4-15-9-11-18-17-10-8-16-7-5-6-13-20(16,2)19(17)12-14-21(15,18)3/h15-19H,4-14H2,1-3H3/t15-,16-,17-,18-,19-,20-,21+/m0/s1 Key: JWMFYGXQPXQEEM-NUNROCCHSA-N
- SMILES: CC[C@H]1CC[C@@H]2[C@@]1(CC[C@H]3[C@H]2CC[C@H]4[C@@]3(CCCC4)C)C

Properties
Chemical formula	C_{21}H_{36}
Molar mass	288.519 g/mol
- Except where otherwise noted, data are given for materials in their standard state (at 25 °C [77 °F], 100 kPa). Infobox references

5β-Pregnane, also known as 17β-ethyletiocholane or as 10β,13β-dimethyl-17β-ethyl-5β-gonane, is a steroid and a parent compound of a variety of steroid derivatives. It is one of the epimers of pregnane, the other being 5α-pregnane. Derivatives of 5β-pregnane include the naturally occurring steroids 5β-dihydroprogesterone, pregnanolone, epipregnanolone, pregnanediol, and pregnanetriol, and the synthetic steroids hydroxydione, renanolone, ORG-20599, and SAGE-217. These derivatives include metabolites of progesterone and endogenous and synthetic neurosteroids.

== See also ==
- Etiocholane
- Gonane
