= CIM-0216 =

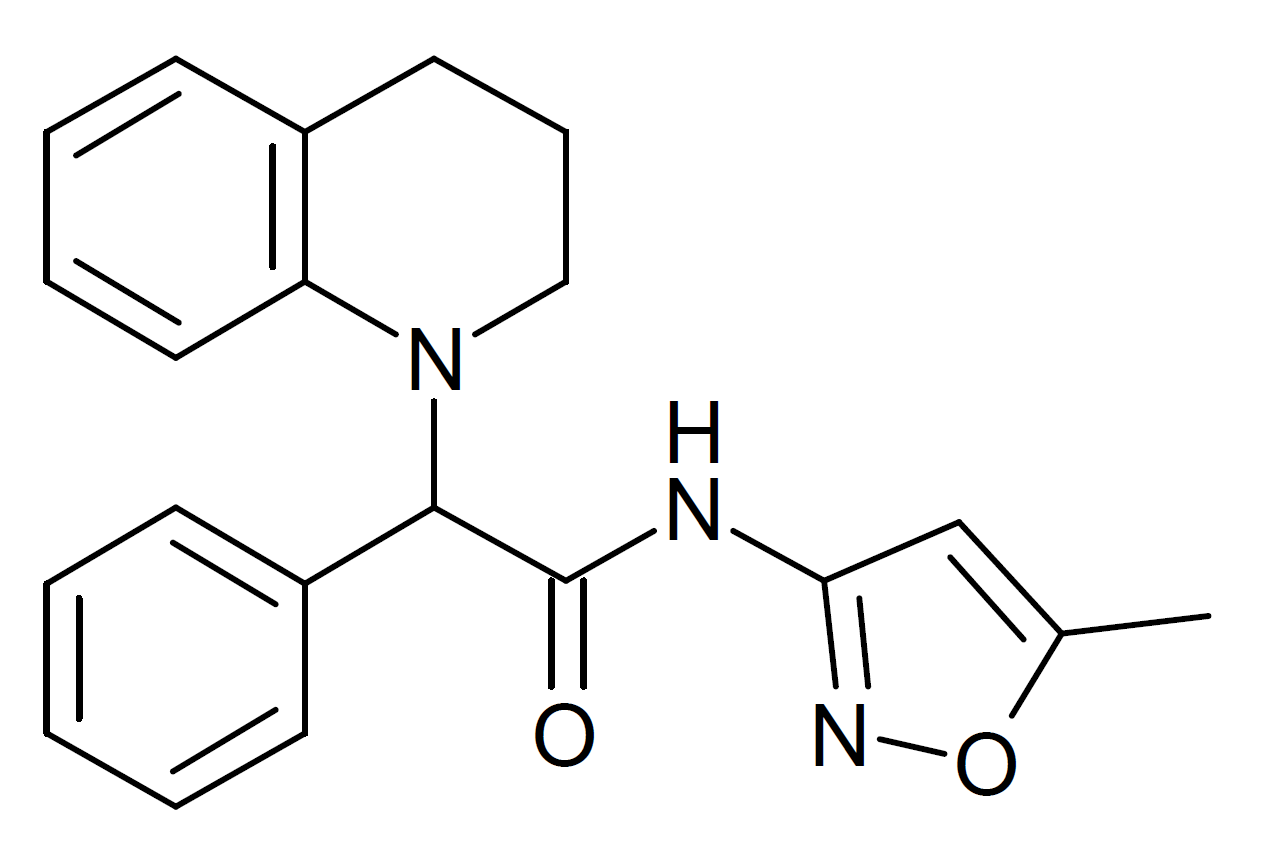

Names
- Preferred IUPAC name 2-(3,4-Dihydroquinolin-1(2H)-yl)-N-(5-methyl-1,2-oxazol-3-yl)-2-phenylacetamide

Identifiers
| CAS Number | 1031496-06-6 |
| 3D model (JSmol) | Interactive image |
| ChEMBL | ChEMBL4303225 |
| ChemSpider | 21960401 |
| PubChem CID | 42887770 |
| CompTox Dashboard (EPA) | DTXSID501336574 |
- InChI: InChI=1S/C21H21N3O2/c1-15-14-19(23-26-15)22-21(25)20(17-9-3-2-4-10-17)24-13-7-11-16-8-5-6-12-18(16)24/h2-6,8-10,12,14,20H,7,11,13H2,1H3,(H,22,23,25) Key: KSEXDSJYVSEVGF-UHFFFAOYSA-N
- SMILES: CC1=CC(=NO1)NC(=O)C(C2=CC=CC=C2)N3CCCC4=CC=CC=C43

Properties
| Chemical formula | C_{21}H_{21}N_{3}O_{2} |
| Molar mass | 347.418 g·mol^{−1} |

Hazards
- GHS labelling
| Pictograms | (GHS07: Exclamation mark) |
| Signal word | Warning |
| Hazard statements | H302, H315, H319, H335 |
| Precautionary statements | P261, P264, P270, P271, P280, P301+P312, P302+P352, P304+P340, P305+P351+P338, P312, P321, P330, P332+P313, P337+P313, P362, P403+P233, P405, P501 |
- Except where otherwise noted, data are given for materials in their standard state (at 25 °C [77 °F], 100 kPa). Infobox references

CIM-0216 is a chemical compound which acts as a potent and selective activator of the TRPM3 calcium channel. It produces nociception and inflammation and is used to study the function of the TRPM3 receptor in these processes.
