= TRPM3 =

Protein-coding gene in the species Homo sapiens

Identifiers
- Aliases: TRPM3, GON-2, LTRPC3, MLSN2, transient receptor potential cation channel subfamily M member 3
- External IDs: OMIM: 608961; MGI: 2443101; GeneCards: TRPM3

Gene location (Human)
Chr.	Chromosome 9 (human)
Band	9q21.12-q21.13	Start	70,529,060 bp
Band	9q21.12-q21.13	End	71,446,904 bp

Gene location (Mouse)
Chr.	Chromosome 19 (mouse)
Band	19|19 B	Start	22,116,410 bp
Band	19|19 B	End	22,972,774 bp
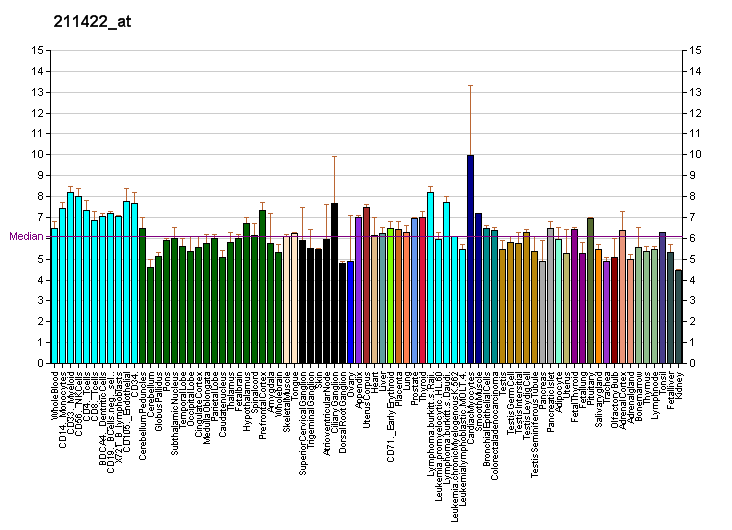

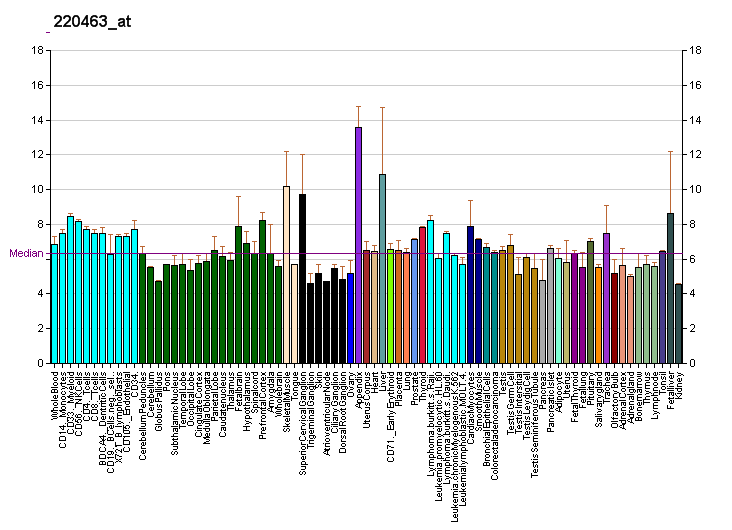

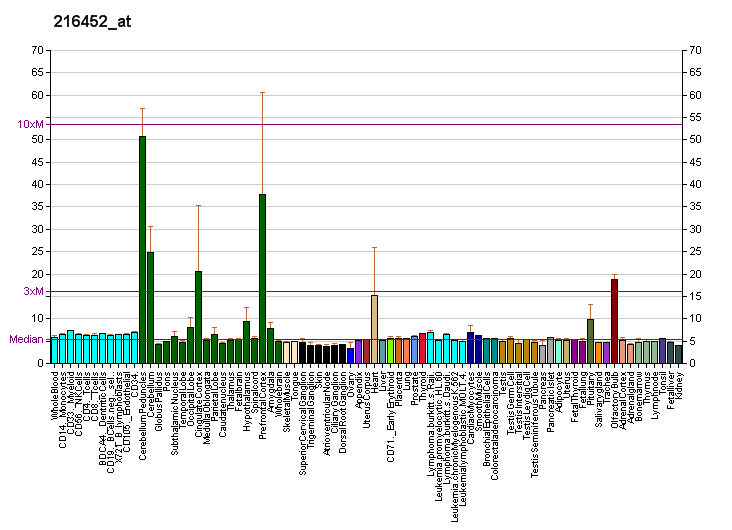
RNA expression pattern
Bgee	Human / Mouse (ortholog); Top expressed in: retinal pigment epithelium; dorsal motor nucleus of vagus nerve; internal globus pallidus; buccal mucosa cell; sural nerve; inferior olivary nucleus; external globus pallidus; cerebellar vermis; superior vestibular nucleus; pars compacta / Top expressed in: retinal pigment epithelium; ciliary body; Epithelium of choroid plexus; epithelium of lens; otolith organ; utricle; lobe of cerebellum; median eminence; cerebellar vermis; superior colliculus; More reference expression data
BioGPS	More reference expression data
Gene ontology
Molecular function	ion channel activity; calcium activated cation channel activity; cation channel activity; calcium channel activity
Cellular component	integral component of membrane; plasma membrane; membrane
Biological process	detection of temperature stimulus; ion transport; protein tetramerization; sensory perception of temperature stimulus; calcium ion transport; ion transmembrane transport; cation transport; transmembrane transport; calcium ion transmembrane transport
Sources:Amigo / QuickGO
Orthologs
Databases	NCBI: entry; OMA: entry
Species	Human	Mouse
Entrez	80036	226025
Ensembl	ENSG00000083067	ENSMUSG00000052387
UniProt	Q9HCF6	n/a
RefSeq (mRNA)	NM_001007470; NM_001007471; NM_020952; NM_024971; NM_206944 NM_206945; NM_206946; NM_206947; NM_206948; NM_001366141; NM_001366142; NM_001366143; NM_001366144; NM_001366145; NM_001366146; NM_001366147; NM_001366148; NM_001366149; NM_001366150; NM_001366151; NM_001366152; NM_001366153; NM_001366154	NM_001035239; NM_001035240; NM_001035241; NM_001035242; NM_001035243 NM_001035244; NM_001035245; NM_001035246; NM_177341; NM_001362487; NM_001362488; NM_001362489; NM_001362490; NM_001362491; NM_001362496; NM_001362497; NM_001362498; NM_001362499; NM_001362500; NM_001362501; NM_001362502; NM_001362503; NM_001362504; NM_001362505; NM_001362506; NM_001362507; NM_001362508; NM_001362511; NM_001362512; NM_001362513
RefSeq (protein)	NP_001007471; NP_001007472; NP_066003; NP_079247; NP_996827 NP_996828; NP_996829; NP_996830; NP_996831; NP_001353070; NP_001353071; NP_001353072; NP_001353073; NP_001353074; NP_001353075; NP_001353076; NP_001353077; NP_001353078; NP_001353079; NP_001353080; NP_001353081; NP_001353082; NP_001353083	n/a
Location (UCSC)	Chr 9: 70.53 – 71.45 Mb	Chr 19: 22.12 – 22.97 Mb
PubMed search
- Wikidata
View/Edit Human	View/Edit Mouse

Transient receptor potential cation channel subfamily M member 3 is a protein that in humans is encoded by the TRPM3 gene.

== Function ==
The product of this gene belongs to the family of transient receptor potential (TRP) channels. TRP channels are Ca^{2+} permeable non-selective cation channels that play roles in a wide variety of physiological processes, including calcium signaling, heat and cold sensation, calcium and magnesium homeostasis. TRPMs mediates sodium and calcium entry, which induces depolarization and a cytoplasmic Ca^{2+} signal. Alternatively spliced transcript variants encoding different isoforms have been -identified. TRPM3 was shown to be activated by the neurosteroid pregnenolone sulfate as well as the synthetic compound CIM0216.

=== Peripheral heat sensation ===
TRPM3 is expressed in peripheral sensory neurons of the dorsal root ganglia, and they are activated by high temperatures. Genetic deletion of TRPM3 in mice reduces sensitivity to noxious heat, as well as inflammatory thermal hyperalgesia. Inhibitors of TRPM3 were also shown to reduce noxious heat and inflammatory heat hyperalgesia, as well as reduce heat hyperalgesia and spontaneous pain in nerve injury induced neuropathic pain.

=== Receptor mediated inhibition ===
TRPM3 is robustly inhibited by the activation of cell surface receptors that couple to inhibitory heterotrimeric G-proteins (Gi) via direct binding of the Gβγ subunit of the G-protein to the channel. Gβγ was shown to bind to a short α-helical segment of the channel. Receptors that inhibit TRPM3 include opioid receptors and GABA_{B} receptors.

=== TRPM3 in the brain ===
Mutations in TRPM3 in humans, were recently shown to cause an intellectual disability and epilepsy. The disease associated mutations were shown to increase the sensitivity of the channel to agonists, and heat.

== TRPM3 ligands, activators and modulators ==
=== Activators ===
- Heat
- Pregnenolone Sulfate
- CIM-0216

=== Channel Blockers ===
1. Mefenamic acid
2. Citrus fruit flavonoids, e.g. naringenin, isosakuranetin and hesperetin, as well as ononetin (a deoxybenzoin).
3. Primidone, a clinically used antiepileptic medication also directly inhibits TRPM3.

=== Activity Modulator ===
- pH

== See also ==
- TRPM
- TRPM3-related neurodevelopmental disorders
