= 20S-Hydroxycholesterol =

Names
- IUPAC name Cholest-5-ene-3β,20-diol
- Systematic IUPAC name (1S,3aS,3bS,7S,9aR,9bS,11aS)-1-[(2S)-2-Hydroxy-6-methylheptan-2-yl]-9a,11a-dimethyl-2,3,3a,3b,4,6,7,8,9,9a,9b,10,11,11a-tetradecahydro-1H-cyclopenta[a]phenanthren-7-ol
- Other names 20α-Hydroxycholesterol; 5-Cholestene-3β,20α-diol; 20(S)-OHC

Identifiers
| CAS Number | 516-72-3 |
| 3D model (JSmol) | Interactive image |
| ChEBI | CHEBI:166801 |
| ChemSpider | 24823271 |
| PubChem CID | 24779600 |
| UNII | 30060WAL99 |
- InChI: InChI=1S/C27H46O2/c1-18(2)7-6-14-27(5,29)24-11-10-22-21-9-8-19-17-20(28)12-15-25(19,3)23(21)13-16-26(22,24)4/h8,18,20-24,28-29H,6-7,9-17H2,1-5H3/t20-,21?,22?,23?,24-,25-,26-,27-/m0/s1 Key: MCKLJFJEQRYRQT-BEOVMOENSA-N
- SMILES: CC(C)CCC[C@@](C)([C@H]1CCC2[C@@]1(CCC3C2CC=C4[C@@]3(CC[C@@H](C4)O)C)C)O

Properties
| Chemical formula | C_{27}H_{46}O_{2} |
| Molar mass | 402.663 g·mol^{−1} |
- Except where otherwise noted, data are given for materials in their standard state (at 25 °C [77 °F], 100 kPa). Infobox references

20S-Hydroxycholesterol is a steroid of the oxysterol class. It is a human metabolite of cholesterol.

20S-Hydroxycholesterol has been the subject of research into its role in human health. For example, 20S-hydroxycholesterol has been found to be an allosteric activator of the Hedgehog signaling pathway, which has implications in cancer research.

More recently, 20S-hydroxycholesterol was identified as an endogenous ligand for the sigma-2 receptor, which had previously been considered an orphan receptor since its discovery in 1990.
