= Pregnenolone sulfate =

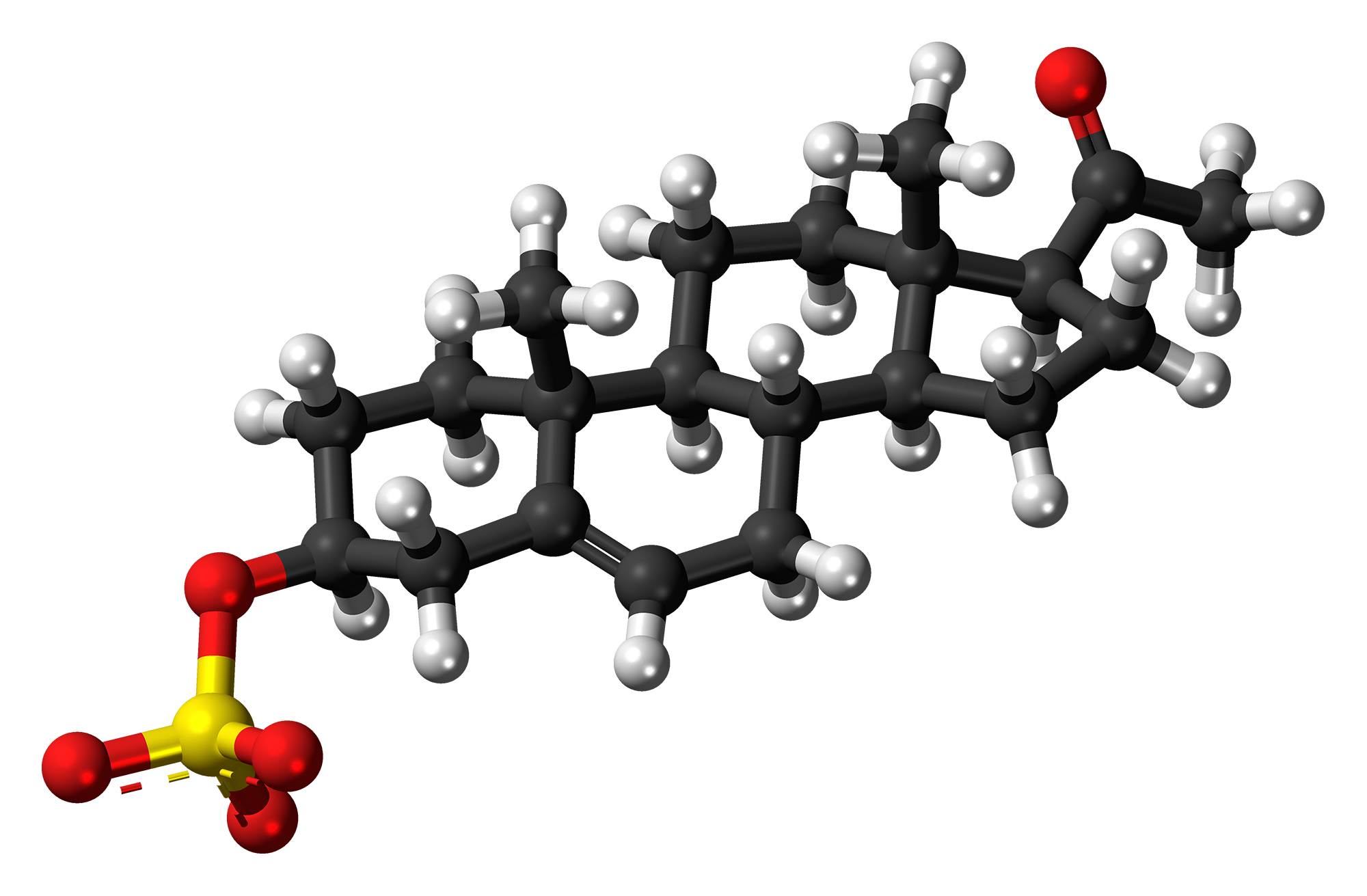

Names
- IUPAC name 20-Oxopregn-5-en-3β-yl hydrogen sulfate
- Systematic IUPAC name (1S,3aS,3bS,7S,9aR,9bS,11aS)-1-Acetyl-9a,11a-dimethyl-2,3,3a,3b,4,6,7,8,9,9a,9b,10,11,11a-tetradecahydro-1H-cyclopenta[a]phenanthren-7-yl hydrogen sulfate
- Other names Pregn-sulf; Pregnenolone monosulfate; Pregnenolone hydrogen sulfate; Pregnenolone 3β-sulfate; 5-Pregnen-3β-ol-20-one sulfate; (3β)-3-(Sulfooxy)pregn-5-en-20-one; 5-Pregnen-3β-sulfate-20-one; 20-Oxo-5-pregnen-3β-yl sulfate

Identifiers
CAS Number	1247-64-9
3D model (JSmol)	Interactive image
ChEMBL	ChEMBL141573
ChemSpider	94802
IUPHAR/BPS	4290
PubChem CID	105074
UNII	04Y4D91RG0
CompTox Dashboard (EPA)	DTXSID60924910
- InChI: InChI=1S/C21H32O5S/c1-13(22)17-6-7-18-16-5-4-14-12-15(26-27(23,24)25)8-10-20(14,2)19(16)9-11-21(17,18)3/h4,15-19H,5-12H2,1-3H3,(H,23,24,25)/t15-,16-,17+,18-,19-,20-,21+/m0/s1 Key: DIJBBUIOWGGQOP-QGVNFLHTSA-N; InChI=1/C21H32O5S/c1-13(22)17-6-7-18-16-5-4-14-12-15(26-27(23,24)25)8-10-20(14,2)19(16)9-11-21(17,18)3/h4,15-19H,5-12H2,1-3H3,(H,23,24,25)/t15-,16-,17+,18-,19-,20-,21+/m0/s1 Key: DIJBBUIOWGGQOP-QGVNFLHTBX
- SMILES: CC(=O)[C@H]1CC[C@@H]2[C@@]1(CC[C@H]3[C@H]2CC=C4[C@@]3(CC[C@@H](C4)OS(=O)(=O)O)C)C

Properties
Chemical formula	C_{21}H_{32}O_{5}S
Molar mass	396.54 g·mol^{−1}
- Except where otherwise noted, data are given for materials in their standard state (at 25 °C [77 °F], 100 kPa). verify (what is ?) Infobox references

Pregnenolone sulfate (PS, PREGS) is an endogenous excitatory neurosteroid that is synthesized from pregnenolone. It is known to have cognitive and memory-enhancing, antidepressant, anxiogenic, and proconvulsant effects.

== Biological activity ==
Pregnenolone sulfate is a neurosteroid with excitatory effects in the brain, acting as a potent negative allosteric modulator of the GABA_{A} receptor and a weak positive allosteric modulator of the NMDA receptor. To a lesser extent, it also acts as a negative allosteric modulator of the AMPA, kainate, and glycine receptors, and may interact with the nACh receptors as well. In addition to its effects on ligand-gated ion channels, pregnenolone sulfate is an agonist of the sigma receptor, as well as an activator of the TRPM1 and TRPM3 channels. It may also interact with potassium channels and voltage-gated sodium channels and has been found to inhibit voltage-gated calcium channels.

== Biochemistry ==
Steroidogenesis, with pregnenolone, the precursor of pregnenolone sulfate, at top left.

=== Biosynthesis ===
Pregnenolone sulfate is synthesized from pregnenolone via sulfation. Pregnenolone itself is produced from cholesterol via cholesterol side-chain cleavage enzyme.

== Chemistry ==
Pregnenolone sulfate, also known as pregn-5-en-3β-ol-20-one 3β-sulfate, is a naturally occurring pregnane steroid and a derivative of cholesterol. It is the C3β sulfate ester of pregnenolone. A closely related steroid is dehydroepiandrosterone sulfate (DHEA-S), which is the C3β sulfate ester of dehydroepiandrosterone (DHEA).
