= Allopregnane =

Steroid chemical compound

Names
- IUPAC name 5α-Pregnane
- Systematic IUPAC name (1S,3aS,3bS,5aR,9aS,9bS,11aR)-1-Ethyl-9a,11a-dimethylhexadecahydro-1H-cyclopenta[a]phenanthrene
- Other names Allopregnane; 17β-Ethyl-5α-androstane; 10β,13β-Dimethyl-17β-ethyl-5α-gonane

Identifiers
CAS Number	641-85-0
3D model (JSmol)	Interactive image
Beilstein Reference	2502007
ChEBI	CHEBI:20656
ChemSpider	5256800
ECHA InfoCard	100.010.345
EC Number	211-378-3
PubChem CID	6857463
UNII	ZTF5KN7S9R
- InChI: InChI=1S/C21H36/c1-4-15-9-11-18-17-10-8-16-7-5-6-13-20(16,2)19(17)12-14-21(15,18)3/h15-19H,4-14H2,1-3H3/t15-,16+,17-,18-,19-,20-,21+/m0/s1 Key: JWMFYGXQPXQEEM-GCOKGBOCSA-N
- SMILES: CC[C@H]1CC[C@@H]2[C@@]1(CC[C@H]3[C@H]2CC[C@@H]4[C@@]3(CCCC4)C)C

Properties
Chemical formula	C_{21}H_{36}
Molar mass	288.519 g/mol

Hazards
- GHS labelling
Hazard statements	H413
Precautionary statements	P273, P501
- Except where otherwise noted, data are given for materials in their standard state (at 25 °C [77 °F], 100 kPa). Infobox references

Allopregnane, also known as 5α-pregnane or as 10β,13β-dimethyl-17β-ethyl-5α-gonane, is a steroid and a parent compound of a variety of steroid derivatives. It is one of the epimers of pregnane, the other being 5β-pregnane. Derivatives of allopregnane include the naturally occurring steroids allopregnanolone, allopregnanediol, isopregnanolone, and 5α-dihydroprogesterone.

== See also ==
- 5β-Pregnane
- Etiocholane
- Gonane
