= 25-Hydroxycholesterol =

Names
- IUPAC name Cholest-5-ene-3β,25-diol
- Systematic IUPAC name (1R,3aS,3bS,7S,9aR,9bS,11aR)-1-[(2R)-6-Hydroxy-6-methylheptan-2-yl]-9a,11a-dimethyl-2,3,3a,3b,4,6,7,8,9,9a,9b,10,11,11a-tetradecahydro-1H-cyclopenta[a]phenanthren-7-ol

Identifiers
CAS Number	2140-46-7
3D model (JSmol)	Interactive image
ChEBI	CHEBI:42977
ChemSpider	58604
DrugBank	04705
ECHA InfoCard	100.163.612
EC Number	635-752-4
KEGG	C15519
PubChem CID	65094
UNII	767JTD2N31
CompTox Dashboard (EPA)	DTXSID5044023
- InChI: InChI=1S/C27H46O2/c1-18(7-6-14-25(2,3)29)22-10-11-23-21-9-8-19-17-20(28)12-15-26(19,4)24(21)13-16-27(22,23)5/h8,18,20-24,28-29H,6-7,9-17H2,1-5H3/t18-,20+,21+,22-,23+,24+,26+,27-/m1/s1 Key: INBGSXNNRGWLJU-ZHHJOTBYSA-N
- SMILES: CC(CCCC(C)(C)O)C1CCC2C1(CCC3C2CC=C4C3(CCC(C4)O)C)C

Properties
Chemical formula	C_{27}H_{46}O_{2}
Molar mass	402.7
- Except where otherwise noted, data are given for materials in their standard state (at 25 °C [77 °F], 100 kPa). Infobox references

25-Hydroxycholesterol is a derivative of cholesterol, which plays a role in various biological processes in humans and other species. It is involved in cholesterol metabolism, antiviral process, inflammatory and immune response, and survival signaling pathway. 25-hydroxycholesterol is biosynthesized from cholesterol by adding a hydroxyl group at the position 25-carbon of a steroid nucleus. This reaction is catalyzed by cholesterol 25-hydroxylase, a family of enzymes that use oxygen and a di-iron cofactor to catalyze hydroxylation reaction.

The CYP3A4 enzyme, a member of the cytochrome P450 family, can catalyze the oxidation of 25-hydroxycholesterol to 7α,25-dihydroxycholesterol, whereas 25-hydroxycholesterol can inhibit CYP4F2 mRNA expression, so that members of the cytochrome P450 family are also involved in the metabolism of 25-hydroxycholesterol besides cholesterol 25-hydroxylase.

25-hydroxycholesterol has been found in various organisms such as mice, rats, rabbits, and cows. As of 2023, its presence in other species has not been extensively studied.

== See also ==
- cholesterol – sterol biosynthesized by all animal cells;
- cholesterol 25-hydroxylase – class of enzymes;
- 27-hydroxycholesterol.
