= 22R-Hydroxycholesterol =

Names
- IUPAC name (22R)-Cholest-5-ene-3β,22-diol
- Systematic IUPAC name (1R,3aS,3bS,7S,9aR,9bS,11aS)-1-[(2S,3R)-3-Hydroxy-6-methylheptan-2-yl]-9a,11a-dimethyl-2,3,3a,3b,4,6,7,8,9,9a,9b,10,11,11a-tetradecahydro-1H-cyclopenta[a]phenanthren-7-ol

Identifiers
| CAS Number | 17711-16-9 |
| 3D model (JSmol) | Interactive image |
| ChEBI | CHEBI:166802 |
| ChEMBL | ChEMBL3218924 |
| ChemSpider | 96893 |
| PubChem CID | 107724 |
| UNII | TJ9HV8VPD2 |
| CompTox Dashboard (EPA) | DTXSID501313409 DTXSID30904340, DTXSID501313409 |
- InChI: InChI=1S/C27H46O2/c1-17(2)6-11-25(29)18(3)22-9-10-23-21-8-7-19-16-20(28)12-14-26(19,4)24(21)13-15-27(22,23)5/h7,17-18,20-25,28-29H,6,8-16H2,1-5H3/t18-,20-,21-,22+,23-,24-,25?,26-,27+/m0/s1 Key: RZPAXNJLEKLXNO-UKNNTIGFSA-N; InChI=1/C27H46O2/c1-17(2)6-11-25(29)18(3)22-9-10-23-21-8-7-19-16-20(28)12-14-26(19,4)24(21)13-15-27(22,23)5/h7,17-18,20-25,28-29H,6,8-16H2,1-5H3/t18-,20-,21-,22+,23-,24-,25?,26-,27+/m0/s1 Key: RZPAXNJLEKLXNO-UKNNTIGFBU
- SMILES: O[C@@H]4C/C3=C/C[C@@H]1[C@H](CC[C@]2([C@H]1CC[C@@H]2[C@H](C)C(O)CCC(C)C)C)[C@@]3(C)CC4

Properties
| Chemical formula | C_{27}H_{46}O_{2} |
| Molar mass | 402.653 g/mol |
- Except where otherwise noted, data are given for materials in their standard state (at 25 °C [77 °F], 100 kPa). Infobox references

22R-Hydroxycholesterol, or (3β)-cholest-5-ene-3,22-diol is an endogenous, metabolic intermediate in the biosynthesis of the steroid hormones from cholesterol. Cholesterol ((3β)-cholest-5-en-3-ol) is hydroxylated by cholesterol side-chain cleavage enzyme (P450scc) to form 22R-hydroxycholesterol, which is subsequently hydroxylated again by P450scc to form 20α,22R-dihydroxycholesterol, and finally the bond between carbons 20 and 22 is cleaved by P450scc to form pregnenolone ((3β)-3-hydroxypregn-5-en-20-one), the precursor to the steroid hormones.

It is an agonist of the liver X receptor.

== See also ==
- 20α,22R-Dihydroxycholesterol
- 27-Hydroxycholesterol
