= Pregnenolone =

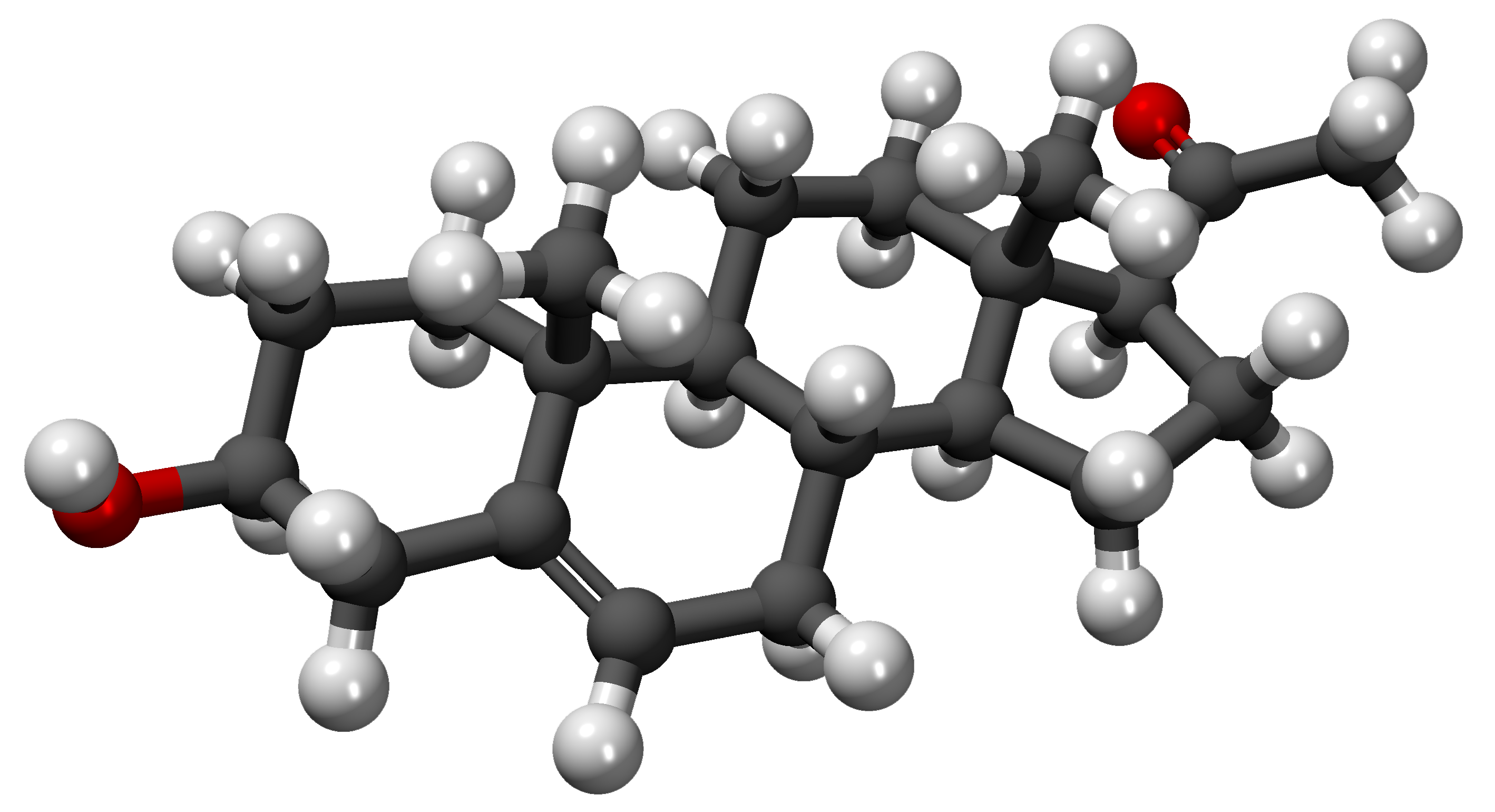

Names
- IUPAC name 3β-Hydroxypregn-5-en-20-one
- Systematic IUPAC name 1-[(1S,3aS,3bS,7S,9aR,9bS,11aS)-7-Hydroxy-9a,11a-dimethyl-2,3,3a,3b,4,6,7,8,9,9a,9b,10,11,11a-tetradecahydro-1H-cyclopenta[a]phenanthren-1-yl]ethan-1-one
- Other names P5; 5-Pregnenolone; δ^{5}-Pregnene-3β-ol-20-one; Pregn-5-en-3β-ol-20-one; NSC-1616

Identifiers
CAS Number	145-13-1
3D model (JSmol)	Interactive image
ChEBI	CHEBI:16581
ChEMBL	ChEMBL253363
ChemSpider	8611
DrugBank	DB02789
ECHA InfoCard	100.005.135
KEGG	C01953
PubChem CID	8955
UNII	73R90F7MQ8
CompTox Dashboard (EPA)	DTXSID1036541
- InChI: InChI=1S/C21H32O2/c1-13(22)17-6-7-18-16-5-4-14-12-15(23)8-10-20(14,2)19(16)9-11-21(17,18)3/h4,15-19,23H,5-12H2,1-3H3/t15-,16-,17+,18-,19-,20-,21+/m0/s1 Key: ORNBQBCIOKFOEO-QGVNFLHTSA-N
- SMILES: CC(=O)[C@H]1CC[C@@H]2[C@@]1(CC[C@H]3[C@H]2CC=C4[C@@]3(CC[C@@H](C4)O)C)C

Properties
Chemical formula	C_{21}H_{32}O_{2}
Molar mass	316.485 g/mol
Melting point	193 °C
- Except where otherwise noted, data are given for materials in their standard state (at 25 °C [77 °F], 100 kPa). Infobox references

Pregnenolone (P5), or pregn-5-en-3β-ol-20-one, is an endogenous steroid and precursor/metabolic intermediate in the biosynthesis of most of the steroid hormones, including the progestogens, androgens, estrogens, glucocorticoids, and mineralocorticoids. In addition, pregnenolone is biologically active in its own right, acting as a neurosteroid.

In addition to its role as a natural hormone, pregnenolone has been used as a medication and supplement; for information on pregnenolone as a medication or supplement, see the pregnenolone (medication) article.

== Biological function ==
Pregnenolone and its 3β-sulfate, pregnenolone sulfate, like dehydroepiandrosterone (DHEA), DHEA sulfate, and progesterone, belong to the group of neurosteroids that are found in high concentrations in certain areas of the brain, and are synthesized there. Neurosteroids affect synaptic functioning, are neuroprotective, and enhance myelinization. Pregnenolone and its sulfate ester may improve cognitive and memory function. In addition, they may have protective effects against schizophrenia.

== Biological activity ==
=== Neurosteroid activity ===
Pregnenolone is an allosteric endocannabinoid, as it is a negative allosteric modulator of the CB_{1} receptor. Pregnenolone is involved in a natural negative feedback loop against CB_{1} receptor activation in animals. It prevents CB_{1} receptor agonists like tetrahydrocannabinol, the main active constituent in cannabis, from fully activating the CB_{1}. A related compound AEF0117 has been derived from pregnenolone and is more specific for this type of activity.

Pregnenolone has been found to bind with high, nanomolar affinity to microtubule-associated protein 2 (MAP2) in the brain. In contrast to pregnenolone, pregnenolone sulfate did not bind to microtubules. However, progesterone did and with similar affinity to pregnenolone, although unlike pregnenolone, it did not increase binding of MAP2 to tubulin. Pregnenolone was found to induce tubule polymerization in neuronal cultures and to increase neurite growth in PC12 cells treated with nerve growth factor. As such, pregnenolone may control formation and stabilization of microtubules in neurons and may affect both neural development during prenatal development and neural plasticity during aging.

Although pregnenolone itself does not possess these activities, its metabolite pregnenolone sulfate is a negative allosteric modulator of the GABA_{A} receptor as well as a positive allosteric modulator of the NMDA receptor. In addition, pregnenolone sulfate has been shown to activate the transient receptor potential M3 (TRPM3) ion channel in hepatocytes and pancreatic islets causing calcium entry and subsequent insulin release.

=== Nuclear receptor activity ===
Pregnenolone has been found to act as an agonist of the pregnane X receptor.

Pregnenolone has no progestogenic, corticosteroid, estrogenic, androgenic, or antiandrogenic activity.

== Biochemistry ==
Steroidogenesis, showing pregnenolone near top left

=== Biosynthesis ===
Pregnenolone is synthesized from cholesterol. This conversion involves hydroxylation of the side chain at the C20 and C22 positions, with cleavage of the side chain. The enzyme performing this task is cytochrome P450scc, located in the mitochondria, and controlled by anterior pituitary trophic hormones, such as adrenocorticotropic hormone, follicle-stimulating hormone, and luteinizing hormone, in the adrenal glands and gonads. There are two intermediates in the transformation of cholesterol into pregnenolone, 22R-hydroxycholesterol and 20α,22R-dihydroxycholesterol, and all three steps in the transformation are catalyzed by P450scc. Pregnenolone is produced mainly in the adrenal glands, the gonads, and the brain. Although pregnenolone is also produced in the gonads and brain, most circulating pregnenolone is derived from the adrenal cortex.

To assay conversion of cholesterol to pregnenolone, radiolabeled cholesterol has been used. Pregnenolone product can be separated from cholesterol substrate using Sephadex LH-20 minicolumns.

=== Distribution ===
Pregnenolone is lipophilic and readily crosses the blood–brain barrier. This is in contrast to pregnenolone sulfate, which does not cross the blood–brain barrier.

=== Metabolism ===
Pregnenolone undergoes further steroid metabolism in one of several ways:

- Pregnenolone can be converted into progesterone. The critical enzyme step is two-fold using a 3β-hydroxysteroid dehydrogenase and a Δ^{5-4} isomerase. The latter transfers the double bond from C5 to C4 on the A ring. Progesterone is the entry into the Δ^{4} pathway, resulting in production of 17α-hydroxyprogesterone and androstenedione, precursor to testosterone and estrone. Aldosterone and corticosteroids are also derived from progesterone or its derivatives.
- Pregnenolone can be converted to 17α-hydroxypregnenolone by the enzyme 17α-hydroxylase (CYP17A1). Using this pathway, termed Δ^{5} pathway, the next step is conversion to dehydroepiandrosterone (DHEA) via 17,20-lyase (CYP17A1). DHEA is the precursor of androstenedione.
- Pregnenolone can be converted to androstadienol by 16-ene synthase (CYP17A1).
- Pregnenolone can be converted to pregnenolone sulfate by steroid sulfotransferase, and this conversion can be reversed by steroid sulfatase.

=== Levels ===
Normal circulating levels of pregnenolone are as follows:

- Men: 10 to 200 ng/dL
- Women: 10 to 230 ng/dL
- Children: 10 to 48 ng/dL
- Adolescent boys: 10 to 50 ng/dL
- Adolescent girls: 15 to 84 ng/dL

Mean levels of pregnenolone have been found not to significantly differ in postmenopausal women and elderly men (40 and 39 ng/dL, respectively).

Studies have found that pregnenolone levels are not significantly changed after surgical or medical castration in men, which is in accordance with the fact that pregnenolone is mainly derived from the adrenal glands. Conversely, medical castration has been found to partially suppress pregnenolone levels in premenopausal women. Similarly, an adrenalectomized premenopausal woman showed incompletely diminished circulating pregnenolone levels.

== Chemistry ==
Pregnenolone is also known chemically as pregn-5-en-3β-ol-20-one. Like other steroids, it consists of four interconnected cyclic hydrocarbons. The compound contains ketone and hydroxyl functional groups, two methyl branches, and a double bond at C5, in the B cyclic hydrocarbon ring. Like many steroid hormones, it is hydrophobic. The sulfated derivative, pregnenolone sulfate, is water-soluble.

3β-Dihydroprogesterone (pregn-4-en-3β-ol-20-one) is an isomer of pregnenolone in which the C5 double bond has been replaced with a C4 double bond.

== History ==
Pregnenolone was first synthesized by Adolf Butenandt and colleagues in 1934.
