= 7α-Hydroxycholesterol =

Names
- IUPAC name Cholest-5-ene-3β,7α-diol
- Systematic IUPAC name (1R,3aS,3bS,4S,7S,9aR,9bS,11aR)-9a,11a-Dimethyl-1-[(2R)-6-methylheptan-2-yl]-2,3,3a,3b,4,6,7,8,9,9a,9b,10,11,11a-tetradecahydro-1H-cyclopenta[a]phenanthrene-4,7-diol

Identifiers
CAS Number	566-26-7
3D model (JSmol)	Interactive image; Interactive image
ChEBI	CHEBI:17500
ChemSpider	96891
IUPHAR/BPS	4351
MeSH	7+alpha-hydroxycholesterol
PubChem CID	107722
UNII	95D0I22I0V
CompTox Dashboard (EPA)	DTXSID40903965
- InChI: InChI=1S/C27H46O2/c1-17(2)7-6-8-18(3)21-9-10-22-25-23(12-14-27(21,22)5)26(4)13-11-20(28)15-19(26)16-24(25)29/h16-18,20-25,28-29H,6-15H2,1-5H3/t18-,20+,21-,22+,23+,24-,25+,26+,27-/m1/s1 Key: OYXZMSRRJOYLLO-RVOWOUOISA-N; InChI=1/C27H46O2/c1-17(2)7-6-8-18(3)21-9-10-22-25-23(12-14-27(21,22)5)26(4)13-11-20(28)15-19(26)16-24(25)29/h16-18,20-25,28-29H,6-15H2,1-5H3/t18-,20+,21-,22+,23+,24-,25+,26+,27-/m1/s1 Key: OYXZMSRRJOYLLO-RVOWOUOIBF
- SMILES: CC(C)CCC[C@@H](C)[C@H]1CC[C@@H]2[C@@]1(CC[C@H]3[C@H]2[C@@H](C=C4[C@@]3(CC[C@@H](C4)O)C)O)C; O[C@@H]4C/C3=C/[C@@H](O)[C@@H]1[C@H](CC[C@]2([C@H]1CC[C@@H]2[C@H](C)CCCC(C)C)C)[C@@]3(C)CC4

Properties
Chemical formula	C_{27}H_{46}O_{2}
Molar mass	402.653 g/mol
- Except where otherwise noted, data are given for materials in their standard state (at 25 °C [77 °F], 100 kPa). verify (what is ?) Infobox references

7α-Hydroxycholesterol is a precursor of bile acids, created by cholesterol 7α-hydroxylase (CYP7A1). Its formation is the rate-determining step in bile acid synthesis.
