= 27-Hydroxycholesterol =

Names
- IUPAC name (25R)-Cholest-5-ene-3β,26-diol
- Systematic IUPAC name (1R,3aS,3bS,7S,9aR,9bS,11aR)-1-[(2R,6R)-7-Hydroxy-6-methylheptan-2-yl]-9a,11a-dimethyl-2,3,3a,3b,4,6,7,8,9,9a,9b,10,11,11a-tetradecahydro-1H-cyclopenta[a]phenanthren-7-ol

Identifiers
CAS Number	20380-11-4
3D model (JSmol)	Interactive image
ChemSpider	110495
IUPHAR/BPS	2752
PubChem CID	123976
UNII	6T2NA6P5SQ
CompTox Dashboard (EPA)	DTXSID40864941
- InChI: InChI=1S/C27H46O2/c1-18(17-28)6-5-7-19(2)23-10-11-24-22-9-8-20-16-21(29)12-14-26(20,3)25(22)13-15-27(23,24)4/h8,18-19,21-25,28-29H,5-7,9-17H2,1-4H3/t18-,19-,21+,22+,23-,24+,25+,26+,27-/m1/s1 Key: FYHRJWMENCALJY-YSQMORBQSA-N
- SMILES: C[C@H](CCC[C@@H](C)[C@H]1CC[C@@H]2[C@@]1(CC[C@H]3[C@H]2CC=C4[C@@]3(CC[C@@H](C4)O)C)C)CO

Properties
Chemical formula	C_{27}H_{46}O_{2}
Molar mass	402.663 g·mol^{−1}
- Except where otherwise noted, data are given for materials in their standard state (at 25 °C [77 °F], 100 kPa). Infobox references

27-Hydroxycholesterol (27-HC) is an endogenous oxysterol with multiple biological functions, including activity as a selective estrogen receptor modulator (SERM) (a mixed, tissue-specific agonist-antagonist of the estrogen receptor (ER)) and as an agonist of the liver X receptor (LXR). It is a metabolite of cholesterol that is produced by the enzyme CYP27A1.

A link between high cholesterol and breast cancer has been identified, and it has been proposed that this is due to 27-HC production by CYP27A1. Because of its estrogenic action, 27-HC stimulates the growth of ER-positive breast cancer cells, and has been implicated in limiting the effectiveness of aromatase inhibitors in the treatment of breast cancer. As such, identified CYP27A1 inhibitors, including the marketed drugs anastrozole, fadrozole, bicalutamide, dexmedetomidine, ravuconazole, and posaconazole, have been proposed as potential adjuvant therapies in ER-positive breast cancer.

== See also ==
- 22R-Hydroxycholesterol
- 20α,22R-Dihydroxycholesterol
- 25-Hydroxycholesterol
