= Pregnane =

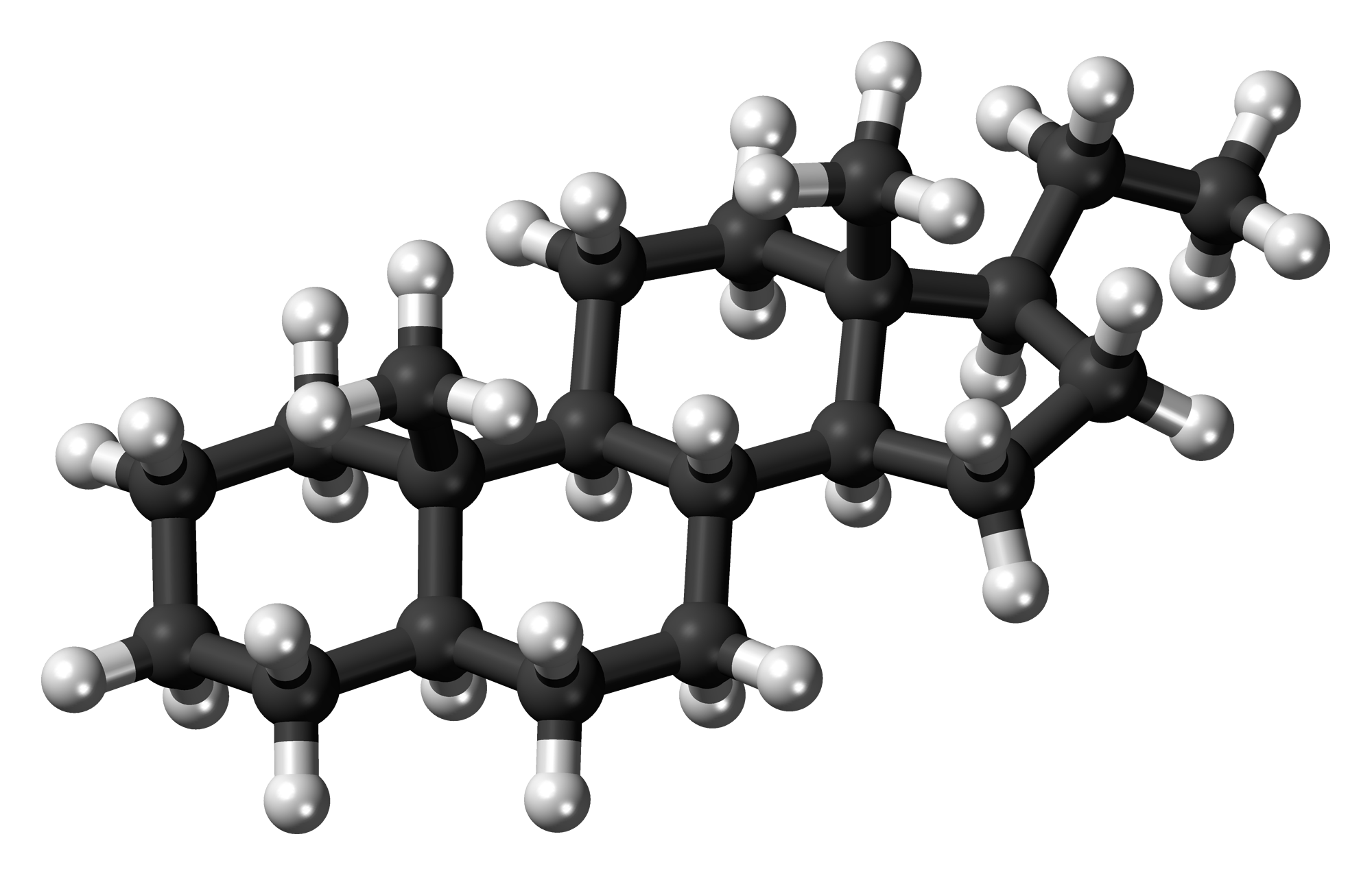

Names
- IUPAC name 5ξ-Pregnane
- Systematic IUPAC name (1S,3aS,3bS,5aΞ,9aS,9bS,11aR)-1-Ethyl-9a,11a-dimethylhexadecahydro-1H-cyclopenta[a]phenanthrene

Identifiers
CAS Number	481-26-5
3D model (JSmol)	Interactive image
ChEBI	CHEBI:8386
ChemSpider	5256760
PubChem CID	6857422
UNII	10Z78HHV4C
CompTox Dashboard (EPA)	DTXSID10425881
- InChI: InChI=1S/C21H36/c1-4-15-9-11-18-17-10-8-16-7-5-6-13-20(16,2)19(17)12-14-21(15,18)3/h15-19H,4-14H2,1-3H3/t15-,16?,17-,18-,19-,20-,21+/m0/s1 Key: JWMFYGXQPXQEEM-WZBAXQLOSA-N; InChI=1/C21H36/c1-4-15-9-11-18-17-10-8-16-7-5-6-13-20(16,2)19(17)12-14-21(15,18)3/h15-19H,4-14H2,1-3H3/t15-,16?,17-,18-,19-,20-,21+/m0/s1 Key: JWMFYGXQPXQEEM-WZBAXQLOBZ
- SMILES: C41CCCC[C@@]1([C@@H]3[C@H]([C@@H]2CC[C@@H]([C@@]2(C)CC3)CC)CC4)C

Properties
Chemical formula	C_{21}H_{36}
Molar mass	288.511 g/mol
Density	0.926 g/ml
- Except where otherwise noted, data are given for materials in their standard state (at 25 °C [77 °F], 100 kPa). verify (what is ?) Infobox references

Pregnane, also known as 17β-ethylandrostane or as 10β,13β-dimethyl-17β-ethylgonane, is a C21 steroid and, indirectly, a parent of progesterone. It is a parent hydrocarbon for two series of steroids stemming from 5α-pregnane (originally allopregnane) and 5β-pregnane (17β-ethyletiocholane). It has a gonane core.

5β-Pregnane is the parent of pregnanediones, pregnanolones, and pregnanediols, and is found largely in urine as a metabolic product of 5β-pregnane compounds.

== Pregnanes ==
Steroid nomenclature: Pregnanes have carbons 1 through 21.

Pregnanes are steroid derivatives with carbons present at positions 1 through 21.

Most biologically significant pregnane derivatives fall into one of two groups: pregnenes and pregnadienes. Another class is pregnatrienes.

== Pregnenes ==
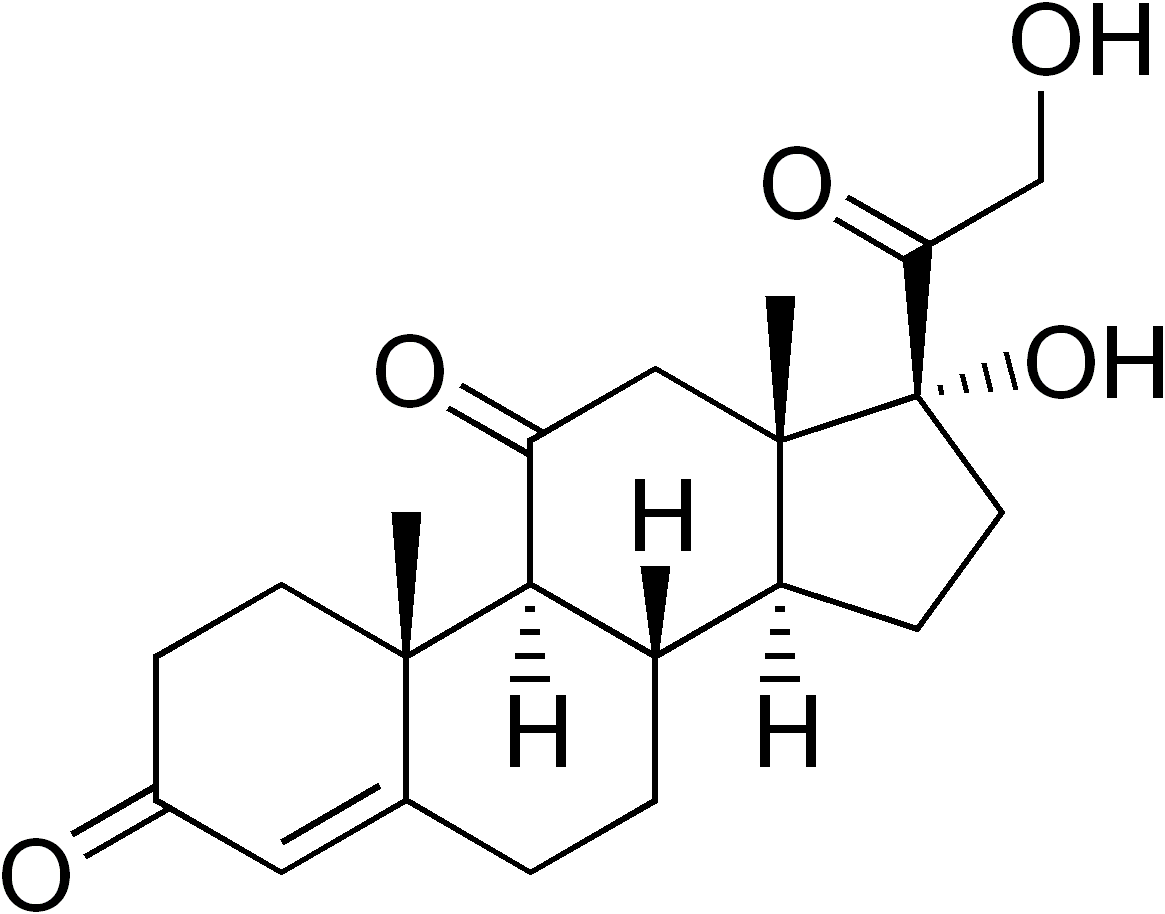
Cortisone

Pregnenes have a double bond. Examples include:

- Cortisone
- Hydrocortisone
- Progesterone

== Pregnadienes ==
Cyproterone acetate

Pregnadienes have two double bonds. Examples include:

- Cyproterone acetate
- Danazol
- Fluocinonide

== See also ==
- 5β-Pregnane
- Pregnanedione
- Pregnanediol
- 19-Norpregnane
- Androstane
- Estrane
