= C24H32O8 =

The molecular formula C_{24}H_{32}O_{8} may refer to:

- Estradiol glucuronides
  - Estradiol 3-glucuronide
  - Estradiol 17β-glucuronide
- Salvinorin B ethoxymethyl ether
