= Estradiol glucuronide =

Names
- IUPAC name 3-Hydroxyestra-1,3,5(10)-trien-17β-yl β-D-glucopyranosiduronic acid
- Systematic IUPAC name (2S,3S,4S,5R,6R)-3,4,5-Trihydroxy-6-{[(1S,3aS,3bR,9bS,11aS)-7-hydroxy-11a-methyl-2,3,3a,3b,4,5,9b,10,11,11a-decahydro-1H-cyclopenta[a]phenanthren-1-yl]oxy}oxane-2-carboxylic acid
- Other names E217βG; 17β-Estradiol 17β-D-glucuronide; Estra-1,3,5(10)-triene-3,17β-diol 17β-D-glucuronoside

Identifiers
CAS Number	1806-98-0
3D model (JSmol)	Interactive image
ChEBI	CHEBI:791
ChEMBL	ChEMBL1697724
ChemSpider	4445177
KEGG	C11237
PubChem CID	5281887
CompTox Dashboard (EPA)	DTXSID50862756
- InChI: InChI=1S/C24H32O8/c1-24-9-8-14-13-5-3-12(25)10-11(13)2-4-15(14)16(24)6-7-17(24)31-23-20(28)18(26)19(27)21(32-23)22(29)30/h3,5,10,14-21,23,25-28H,2,4,6-9H2,1H3,(H,29,30)/t14-,15-,16+,17+,18+,19+,20-,21+,23-,24+/m1/s1 Key: MTKNDAQYHASLID-QXYWQCSFSA-N
- SMILES: C[C@]12CC[C@H]3[C@H]([C@@H]1CC[C@@H]2O[C@H]4[C@@H]([C@H]([C@@H]([C@H](O4)C(=O)O)O)O)O)CCC5=C3C=CC(=C5)O

Properties
Chemical formula	C_{24}H_{32}O_{8}
Molar mass	448.512 g·mol^{−1}
- Except where otherwise noted, data are given for materials in their standard state (at 25 °C [77 °F], 100 kPa). Infobox references

Estradiol glucuronide, or estradiol 17β-D-glucuronide, is a conjugated metabolite of estradiol. It is formed from estradiol in the liver by UDP-glucuronyltransferase via attachment of glucuronic acid and is eventually excreted in the urine by the kidneys. It has much higher water solubility than does estradiol. Glucuronides are the most abundant estrogen conjugates.

estradiol
+ UDP-glucuronate
UDP
estradiol glucuronide

== Estradiol metabolism ==
When exogenous estradiol is administered orally, it is subject to extensive first-pass metabolism (95%) in the intestines and liver. A single administered dose of estradiol is absorbed 15% as estrone, 25% as estrone sulfate, 25% as estradiol glucuronide, and 25% as estrone glucuronide. Formation of estrogen glucuronide conjugates is particularly important with oral estradiol as the percentage of estrogen glucuronide conjugates in circulation is much higher with oral ingestion than with parenteral estradiol. Estradiol glucuronide can be converted back into estradiol, and a large circulating pool of estrogen glucuronide and sulfate conjugates serves as a long-lasting reservoir of estradiol that effectively extends its elimination half-life of oral estradiol. In demonstration of the importance of first-pass metabolism and the estrogen conjugate reservoir in the pharmacokinetics of estradiol, the elimination half-life of oral estradiol is 13 to 20 hours whereas with intravenous injection its elimination half-life is only about 1 to 2 hours.

Approximately 7% of estradiol is excreted in the urine as estradiol glucuronide.

== Properties of estradiol glucuronide ==
Estradiol glucuronide is transported into prostate gland, testis, and breast cells by OATP1A2, OATP1B1, OATP1B3, OATP1C1, and OATP3A1. The ABC transporters MRP2, MRP3, MRP4, and BCRP, as well as several other transporters, have been found to transport estradiol glucuronide out of cells.

The circulating concentrations of estrogen glucuronides are generally more than 10-fold lower than those of estrone sulfate, the most abundant estrogen conjugate in the circulation.

Estradiol glucuronide has been identified as an agonist of the G protein-coupled estrogen receptor (GPER), a membrane estrogen receptor. This may be involved in estradiol glucuronide-induced cholestasis.

Estrogen glucuronides can be deglucuronidated into the corresponding free estrogens by β-glucuronidase in tissues that express this enzyme, such as the mammary gland. As a result, estrogen glucuronides have estrogenic activity via conversion into estrogens.

Estradiol glucuronide shows about 300-fold lower potency in activating the estrogen receptors relative to estradiol in vitro.

The positional isomer of estradiol glucuronide, estradiol 3-glucuronide, also occurs as a major endogenous metabolite of estradiol, circulating at two-thirds of the levels of estrone sulfate when it reaches its maximal concentrations just before ovulation and during the peak in estradiol levels that occurs at this time.

Affinities and estrogenic potencies of estrogen esters and ethers at the estrogen receptors
Estrogen	Other names	RBA (%)^{a}	REP (%)^{b}	
Estrogen	Other names	ER	ERα	ERβ
Estradiol	E2	100	100	100
Estradiol 3-sulfate	E2S; E2-3S	?	0.02	0.04
Estradiol 3-glucuronide	E2-3G	?	0.02	0.09
Estradiol 17β-glucuronide	E2-17G	?	0.002	0.0002
Estradiol benzoate	EB; Estradiol 3-benzoate	10	1.1	0.52
Estradiol 17β-acetate	E2-17A	31–45	24	?
Estradiol diacetate	EDA; Estradiol 3,17β-diacetate	?	0.79	?
Estradiol propionate	EP; Estradiol 17β-propionate	19–26	2.6	?
Estradiol valerate	EV; Estradiol 17β-valerate	2–11	0.04–21	?
Estradiol cypionate	EC; Estradiol 17β-cypionate	?^{c}	4.0	?
Estradiol palmitate	Estradiol 17β-palmitate	0	?	?
Estradiol stearate	Estradiol 17β-stearate	0	?	?
Estrone	E1; 17-Ketoestradiol	11	5.3–38	14
Estrone sulfate	E1S; Estrone 3-sulfate	2	0.004	0.002
Estrone glucuronide	E1G; Estrone 3-glucuronide	?	<0.001	0.0006
Ethinylestradiol	EE; 17α-Ethynylestradiol	100	17–150	129
Mestranol	EE 3-methyl ether	1	1.3–8.2	0.16
Quinestrol	EE 3-cyclopentyl ether	?	0.37	?
Footnotes: ^{a} = Relative binding affinities (RBAs) were determined via in-vitro displacement of labeled estradiol from estrogen receptors (ERs) generally of rodent uterine cytosol. Estrogen esters are variably hydrolyzed into estrogens in these systems (shorter ester chain length -> greater rate of hydrolysis) and the ER RBAs of the esters decrease strongly when hydrolysis is prevented. ^{b} = Relative estrogenic potencies (REPs) were calculated from half-maximal effective concentrations (EC_{50}) that were determined via in-vitro β‐galactosidase (β-gal) and green fluorescent protein (GFP) production assays in yeast expressing human ERα and human ERβ. Both mammalian cells and yeast have the capacity to hydrolyze estrogen esters. ^{c} = The affinities of estradiol cypionate for the ERs are similar to those of estradiol valerate and estradiol benzoate (figure). Sources: See template page.

Structural properties of selected estradiol esters
Estrogen	Structure	Ester(s)				Relative mol. weight	Relative E2 content^{b}	log P^{c}
Estrogen	Structure	Position(s)	Moiet(ies)	Type	Length^{a}	Relative mol. weight	Relative E2 content^{b}	log P^{c}
Estradiol		–	–	–	–	1.00	1.00	4.0
Estradiol acetate		C3	Ethanoic acid	Straight-chain fatty acid	2	1.15	0.87	4.2
Estradiol benzoate		C3	Benzoic acid	Aromatic fatty acid	– (~4–5)	1.38	0.72	4.7
Estradiol dipropionate		C3, C17β	Propanoic acid (×2)	Straight-chain fatty acid	3 (×2)	1.41	0.71	4.9
Estradiol valerate		C17β	Pentanoic acid	Straight-chain fatty acid	5	1.31	0.76	5.6–6.3
Estradiol benzoate butyrate		C3, C17β	Benzoic acid, butyric acid	Mixed fatty acid	– (~6, 2)	1.64	0.61	6.3
Estradiol cypionate		C17β	Cyclopentylpropanoic acid	Cyclic fatty acid	– (~6)	1.46	0.69	6.9
Estradiol enanthate		C17β	Heptanoic acid	Straight-chain fatty acid	7	1.41	0.71	6.7–7.3
Estradiol dienanthate		C3, C17β	Heptanoic acid (×2)	Straight-chain fatty acid	7 (×2)	1.82	0.55	8.1–10.4
Estradiol undecylate		C17β	Undecanoic acid	Straight-chain fatty acid	11	1.62	0.62	9.2–9.8
Estradiol stearate		C17β	Octadecanoic acid	Straight-chain fatty acid	18	1.98	0.51	12.2–12.4
Estradiol distearate		C3, C17β	Octadecanoic acid (×2)	Straight-chain fatty acid	18 (×2)	2.96	0.34	20.2
Estradiol sulfate		C3	Sulfuric acid	Water-soluble conjugate	–	1.29	0.77	0.3–3.8
Estradiol glucuronide		C17β	Glucuronic acid	Water-soluble conjugate	–	1.65	0.61	2.1–2.7
Estramustine phosphate^{d}		C3, C17β	Normustine, phosphoric acid	Water-soluble conjugate	–	1.91	0.52	2.9–5.0
Polyestradiol phosphate^{e}		C3–C17β	Phosphoric acid	Water-soluble conjugate	–	1.23^{f}	0.81^{f}	2.9^{g}
Footnotes: ^{a} = Length of ester in carbon atoms for straight-chain fatty acids or approximate length of ester in carbon atoms for aromatic or cyclic fatty acids. ^{b} = Relative estradiol content by weight (i.e., relative estrogenic exposure). ^{c} = Experimental or predicted octanol/water partition coefficient (i.e., lipophilicity/hydrophobicity). Retrieved from PubChem, ChemSpider, and DrugBank. ^{d} = Also known as estradiol normustine phosphate. ^{e} = Polymer of estradiol phosphate (~13 repeat units). ^{f} = Relative molecular weight or estradiol content per repeat unit. ^{g} = log P of repeat unit (i.e., estradiol phosphate). Sources: See individual articles.

== See also ==
- Catechol estrogen
- Estradiol sulfate
- Estriol glucuronide
- Estriol sulfate
- Estrogen conjugate
- Lipoidal estradiol
- List of estrogen esters § Estradiol esters
