= Estrone sulfate =

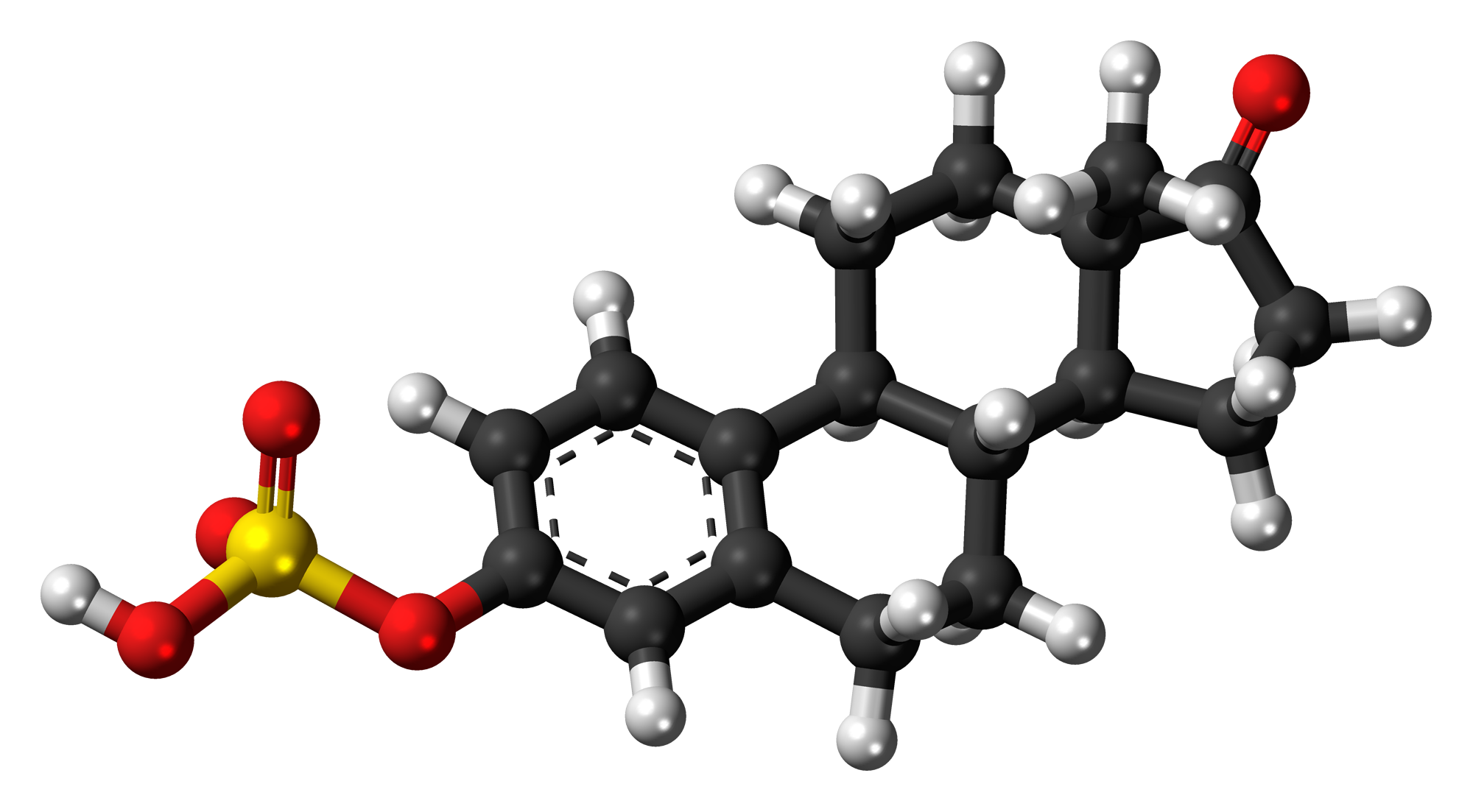

Names
- IUPAC name 17-Oxoestra-1,3,5(10)-trien-3-yl hydrogen sulfate
- Systematic IUPAC name (3aS,3bR,9bS,11aS)-11a-Methyl-1-oxo-2,3,3a,3b,4,5,9b,10,11,11a-decahydro-1H-cyclopenta[a]phenanthren-7-yl hydrogen sulfate
- Other names E1S; Oestrone sulfate; Estrone 3-sulfate; Estra-1,3,5(10)-trien-17-one 3-sulfate

Identifiers
CAS Number	481-97-0; 438-67-5 (sodium salt)
3D model (JSmol)	Interactive image
ChEBI	CHEBI:17474
ChEMBL	ChEMBL494753
ChemSpider	2272513
DrugBank	DB04574
ECHA InfoCard	100.006.888
EC Number	207-120-4
KEGG	C02538
PubChem CID	3001028
UNII	QTL48N278K
CompTox Dashboard (EPA)	DTXSID50891501
- InChI: InChI=1S/C18H22O5S/c1-18-9-8-14-13-5-3-12(23-24(20,21)22)10-11(13)2-4-15(14)16(18)6-7-17(18)19/h3,5,10,14-16H,2,4,6-9H2,1H3,(H,20,21,22)/t14-,15-,16+,18+/m1/s1 Key: JKKFKPJIXZFSSB-CBZIJGRNSA-N
- SMILES: C[C@]12CC[C@H]3[C@H]([C@@H]1CCC2=O)CCC4=C3C=CC(=C4)OS(=O)(=O)O

Properties
Chemical formula	C_{18}H_{22}O_{5}S
Molar mass	350.429 g/mol
- Except where otherwise noted, data are given for materials in their standard state (at 25 °C [77 °F], 100 kPa). Infobox references

Estrone sulfate, also known as E1S, E1SO4 and estrone 3-sulfate, is a natural, endogenous steroid and an estrogen ester and conjugate.

In addition to its role as a natural hormone, estrone sulfate is used as a medication, for instance in menopausal hormone therapy; for information on estrone sulfate as a medication, see the estrone sulfate (medication) article.

== Biological function ==
E1S itself is biologically inactive, with less than 1% of the relative binding affinity of estradiol for the ERα and ERβ. However, it can be transformed by steroid sulfatase, also known as estrogen sulfatase, into estrone, an estrogen. Simultaneously, estrogen sulfotransferases, including SULT1A1 and SULT1E1, convert estrone to E1S, resulting in an equilibrium between the two steroids in various tissues. Estrone can also be converted by 17β-hydroxysteroid dehydrogenases into the more potent estrogen estradiol. E1S levels are much higher than those of estrone and estradiol, and it is thought to serve as a long-lasting reservoir for estrone and estradiol in the body. In accordance, E1S has been found to transactivate the estrogen receptor at physiologically relevant concentrations. This was diminished with co-application of irosustat (STX-64), a steroid sulfatase inhibitor, indicating the importance of transformation of estrone sulfate into estrone in the estrogenicity of E1S.

Unlike unconjugated estradiol and estrone, which are lipophilic compounds, E1S is an anion and is hydrophilic. As a result of this, whereas estradiol and estrone are able to readily diffuse through the lipid bilayers of cells, E1S is unable to permeate through cell membranes. Instead, estrone sulfate is transported into cells in a tissue-specific manner by active transport via organic-anion-transporting polypeptides (OATPs), including OATP1A2, OATP1B1, OATP1B3, OATP1C1, OATP2B1, OATP3A1, OATP4A1, and OATP4C1, as well as by the sodium-dependent organic anion transporter (SOAT; SLC10A6).

E1S, serving as a precursor and intermediate for estrone and estradiol, may be involved in the pathophysiology of estrogen-associated diseases including breast cancer, benign breast disease, endometrial cancer, ovarian cancer, prostate cancer, and colorectal cancer. For this reason, enzyme inhibitors of steroid sulfatase and 17β-hydroxysteroid dehydrogenase and inhibitors of OATPs, which prevent activation of E1S into estrone and estradiol, are of interest in the potential treatment of such conditions.

Affinities and estrogenic potencies of estrogen esters and ethers at the estrogen receptors
Estrogen	Other names	RBA (%)^{a}	REP (%)^{b}	
Estrogen	Other names	ER	ERα	ERβ
Estradiol	E2	100	100	100
Estradiol 3-sulfate	E2S; E2-3S	?	0.02	0.04
Estradiol 3-glucuronide	E2-3G	?	0.02	0.09
Estradiol 17β-glucuronide	E2-17G	?	0.002	0.0002
Estradiol benzoate	EB; Estradiol 3-benzoate	10	1.1	0.52
Estradiol 17β-acetate	E2-17A	31–45	24	?
Estradiol diacetate	EDA; Estradiol 3,17β-diacetate	?	0.79	?
Estradiol propionate	EP; Estradiol 17β-propionate	19–26	2.6	?
Estradiol valerate	EV; Estradiol 17β-valerate	2–11	0.04–21	?
Estradiol cypionate	EC; Estradiol 17β-cypionate	?^{c}	4.0	?
Estradiol palmitate	Estradiol 17β-palmitate	0	?	?
Estradiol stearate	Estradiol 17β-stearate	0	?	?
Estrone	E1; 17-Ketoestradiol	11	5.3–38	14
Estrone sulfate	E1S; Estrone 3-sulfate	2	0.004	0.002
Estrone glucuronide	E1G; Estrone 3-glucuronide	?	<0.001	0.0006
Ethinylestradiol	EE; 17α-Ethynylestradiol	100	17–150	129
Mestranol	EE 3-methyl ether	1	1.3–8.2	0.16
Quinestrol	EE 3-cyclopentyl ether	?	0.37	?
Footnotes: ^{a} = Relative binding affinities (RBAs) were determined via in-vitro displacement of labeled estradiol from estrogen receptors (ERs) generally of rodent uterine cytosol. Estrogen esters are variably hydrolyzed into estrogens in these systems (shorter ester chain length -> greater rate of hydrolysis) and the ER RBAs of the esters decrease strongly when hydrolysis is prevented. ^{b} = Relative estrogenic potencies (REPs) were calculated from half-maximal effective concentrations (EC_{50}) that were determined via in-vitro β‐galactosidase (β-gal) and green fluorescent protein (GFP) production assays in yeast expressing human ERα and human ERβ. Both mammalian cells and yeast have the capacity to hydrolyze estrogen esters. ^{c} = The affinities of estradiol cypionate for the ERs are similar to those of estradiol valerate and estradiol benzoate (figure). Sources: See template page.

== Chemistry ==
E1S, also known as estrone 3-sulfate or as estra-1,3,5(10)-trien-17-one 3-sulfate, is a naturally occurring estrane steroid and a derivative of estrone. It is an estrogen conjugate or ester, and is specifically the C3 sulfate ester of estrone. Related estrogen conjugates include estradiol sulfate, estriol sulfate, estrone glucuronide, estradiol glucuronide, and estriol glucuronide, while related steroid conjugates include dehydroepiandrosterone sulfate and pregnenolone sulfate.

The logP of E1S is 1.4.

== Biochemistry ==
=== Biosynthesis ===
E1S is produced via estrogen sulfotransferases from the peripheral metabolism of the estrogens estradiol and estrone. Estrogen sulfotransferases are expressed minimally or not at all in the gonads. In accordance, E1S is not secreted in meaningful amounts from the gonads in humans. However, measurable amounts of estrogen sulfates are said to be secreted by the ovaries in any case.

Production rates, secretion rates, clearance rates, and blood levels of major sex hormones
Sex	Sex hormone	Reproductive phase	Blood production rate	Gonadal secretion rate	Metabolic clearance rate	Reference range (serum levels)	
Sex	Sex hormone	Reproductive phase	Blood production rate	Gonadal secretion rate	Metabolic clearance rate	Molar concentration	Mass concentration
Men	Androstenedione	–	2.8 mg/day	1.6 mg/day	2200 L/day	2.8–7.3 nmol/L	80–210 ng/dL
Men	Testosterone	–	6.5 mg/day	6.2 mg/day	950 L/day	6.9–34.7 nmol/L	200–1000 ng/dL
Men	Estrone	–	150 μg/day	110 μg/day	2050 L/day	37–250 pmol/L	10–70 pg/mL
Men	Estradiol	–	60 μg/day	50 μg/day	1600 L/day	<37–210 pmol/L	10–57 pg/mL
Men	Estrone sulfate	–	80 μg/day	Insignificant	167 L/day	600–2500 pmol/L	200–900 pg/mL
Women	Androstenedione	–	3.2 mg/day	2.8 mg/day	2000 L/day	3.1–12.2 nmol/L	89–350 ng/dL
Women	Testosterone	–	190 μg/day	60 μg/day	500 L/day	0.7–2.8 nmol/L	20–81 ng/dL
Women	Estrone	Follicular phase	110 μg/day	80 μg/day	2200 L/day	110–400 pmol/L	30–110 pg/mL
Women	Estrone	Luteal phase	260 μg/day	150 μg/day	2200 L/day	310–660 pmol/L	80–180 pg/mL
Women	Estrone	Postmenopause	40 μg/day	Insignificant	1610 L/day	22–230 pmol/L	6–60 pg/mL
Women	Estradiol	Follicular phase	90 μg/day	80 μg/day	1200 L/day	<37–360 pmol/L	10–98 pg/mL
Women	Estradiol	Luteal phase	250 μg/day	240 μg/day	1200 L/day	699–1250 pmol/L	190–341 pg/mL
Women	Estradiol	Postmenopause	6 μg/day	Insignificant	910 L/day	<37–140 pmol/L	10–38 pg/mL
Women	Estrone sulfate	Follicular phase	100 μg/day	Insignificant	146 L/day	700–3600 pmol/L	250–1300 pg/mL
Women	Estrone sulfate	Luteal phase	180 μg/day	Insignificant	146 L/day	1100–7300 pmol/L	400–2600 pg/mL
Women	Progesterone	Follicular phase	2 mg/day	1.7 mg/day	2100 L/day	0.3–3 nmol/L	0.1–0.9 ng/mL
Women	Progesterone	Luteal phase	25 mg/day	24 mg/day	2100 L/day	19–45 nmol/L	6–14 ng/mL
Notes and sources Notes: "The concentration of a steroid in the circulation is determined by the rate at which it is secreted from glands, the rate of metabolism of precursor or prehormones into the steroid, and the rate at which it is extracted by tissues and metabolized. The secretion rate of a steroid refers to the total secretion of the compound from a gland per unit time. Secretion rates have been assessed by sampling the venous effluent from a gland over time and subtracting out the arterial and peripheral venous hormone concentration. The metabolic clearance rate of a steroid is defined as the volume of blood that has been completely cleared of the hormone per unit time. The production rate of a steroid hormone refers to entry into the blood of the compound from all possible sources, including secretion from glands and conversion of prohormones into the steroid of interest. At steady state, the amount of hormone entering the blood from all sources will be equal to the rate at which it is being cleared (metabolic clearance rate) multiplied by blood concentration (production rate = metabolic clearance rate × concentration). If there is little contribution of prohormone metabolism to the circulating pool of steroid, then the production rate will approximate the secretion rate." Sources: See template.

=== Distribution ===
Whereas free steroids like estradiol are lipophilic and can enter cells via passive diffusion, steroid conjugates like E1S are hydrophilic and are unable to do so. Instead, steroid conjugates require active transport via membrane transport proteins to enter cells.

Studies in animals and humans have had mixed findings on uptake of exogenously administered E1S in normal and tumorous mammary gland tissue. This is in contrast to substantial uptake of exogenously administered estradiol and estrone by the mammary glands. Another animal study found that E1S wasn't taken up by the uterus but was taken up by the liver, where it was hydrolyzed into estrone.

=== Metabolism ===
The elimination half-life of E1S is 10 to 12 hours. Its metabolic clearance rate is 80 L/day/m^{2}.

Ovarian tumors have been found to express steroid sulfatase and have been found to convert E1S into estradiol. This may contribute to the often elevated levels of estradiol observed in women with ovarian cancer.

Metabolic pathways of estradiol in humans

Description: The metabolic pathways involved in the metabolism of estradiol and other natural estrogens (e.g., estrone, estriol) in humans. In addition to the metabolic transformations shown in the diagram, conjugation (e.g., sulfation and glucuronidation) occurs in the case of estradiol and metabolites of estradiol that have one or more available hydroxyl (–OH) groups. Sources: See template page.

=== Levels ===
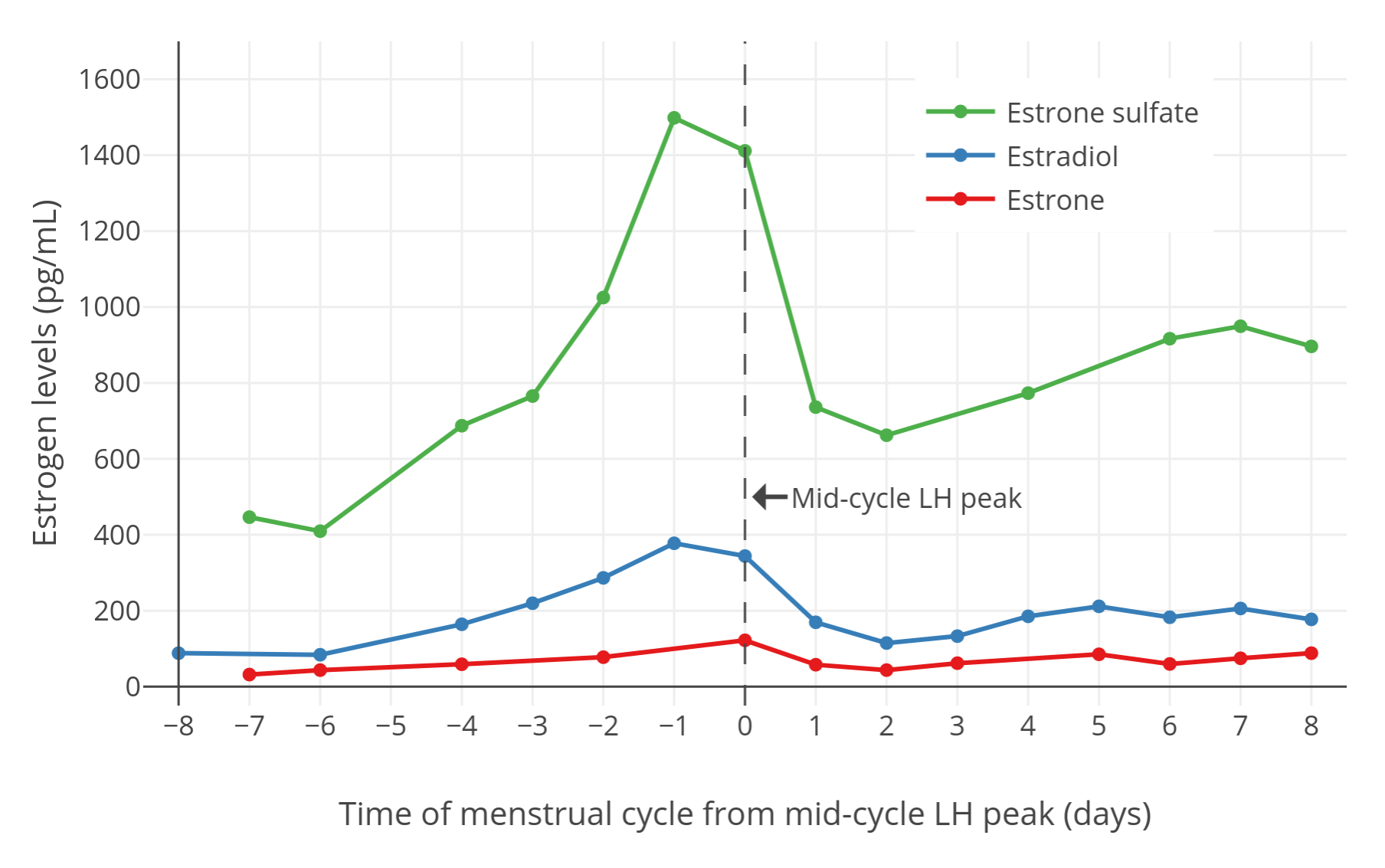
Estrogen levels with radioimmunoassay (RIA) around mid-cycle during the normal menstrual cycle in women. The vertical dashed line in the center is mid-cycle.

E1S levels have been characterized in humans. E1S using radioimmunoassay (RIA) have been reported to be 0.96 ± 0.11 ng/mL in men, 0.96 ± 0.17 ng/mL during the follicular phase in women, 1.74 ± 0.32 ng/mL during the luteal phase in women, 0.74 ± 0.11 ng/mL in women taking oral contraceptives, 0.13 ± 0.03 ng/mL in postmenopausal women, and 2.56 ± 0.47 ng/mL in postmenopausal women on menopausal hormone therapy. In addition, E1S levels in pregnant women were 19 ± 5 ng/mL in the first trimester, 66 ± 31 ng/mL in the second trimester, and 105 ± 22 ng/mL in the third trimester. E1S levels are about 10 to 15 times higher than those of estrone in women.
