= Estradiol palmitate =

Chemical compound

Clinical data
- Trade names: Esmopal
- Other names: Estradiol monopalmitate; Estradiol hexadecanoate; Estradiol 17β-hexadecanoate
- Drug class: Estrogen; Estrogen ester

Identifiers
- IUPAC name: [(8R,9S,13S,14S,17S)-3-Hydroxy-13-methyl-6,7,8,9,11,12,14,15,16,17-decahydrocyclopenta[a]phenanthren-17-yl] hexadecanoate
- CAS Number: 5776-45-4
- PubChem CID: 111095
- ChemSpider: 99723
- UNII: 1Q5Y448XT0
- CompTox Dashboard (EPA): DTXSID00973346
- ECHA InfoCard: 100.024.819

Chemical and physical data
- Formula: C_{34}H_{54}O_{3}
- Molar mass: 510.803 g·mol^{−1}
- 3D model (JSmol): Interactive image
- SMILES: CCCCCCCCCCCCCCCC(=O)O[C@H]1CC[C@H]2[C@@H]3CCc4cc(O)ccc4[C@H]3CC[C@]12C
- InChI: InChI=1S/C34H54O3/c1-3-4-5-6-7-8-9-10-11-12-13-14-15-16-33(36)37-32-22-21-31-30-19-17-26-25-27(35)18-20-28(26)29(30)23-24-34(31,32)2/h18,20,25,29-32,35H,3-17,19,21-24H2,1-2H3/t29-,30-,31+,32+,34+/m1/s1; Key:XQKLZLWOOGGXMV-KWXXMMNJSA-N

Estradiol palmitate (brand name Esmopal), or estradiol monopalmitate, also known as estradiol 17β-hexadecanoate, is a naturally occurring steroidal estrogen and an estrogen ester – specifically, the C17β palmitate ester of estradiol. It occurs in the body as a very long-lasting metabolite and prohormone of estradiol. The compound has no affinity for the estrogen receptor, requiring transformation into estradiol for its estrogenic activity. In addition to its endogenous role, estradiol palmitate was formerly used as a fattening agent in chickens under the brand name Esmopal.

Affinities and estrogenic potencies of estrogen esters and ethers at the estrogen receptors
Estrogen	Other names	RBA (%)^{a}	REP (%)^{b}	
Estrogen	Other names	ER	ERα	ERβ
Estradiol	E2	100	100	100
Estradiol 3-sulfate	E2S; E2-3S	?	0.02	0.04
Estradiol 3-glucuronide	E2-3G	?	0.02	0.09
Estradiol 17β-glucuronide	E2-17G	?	0.002	0.0002
Estradiol benzoate	EB; Estradiol 3-benzoate	10	1.1	0.52
Estradiol 17β-acetate	E2-17A	31–45	24	?
Estradiol diacetate	EDA; Estradiol 3,17β-diacetate	?	0.79	?
Estradiol propionate	EP; Estradiol 17β-propionate	19–26	2.6	?
Estradiol valerate	EV; Estradiol 17β-valerate	2–11	0.04–21	?
Estradiol cypionate	EC; Estradiol 17β-cypionate	?^{c}	4.0	?
Estradiol palmitate	Estradiol 17β-palmitate	0	?	?
Estradiol stearate	Estradiol 17β-stearate	0	?	?
Estrone	E1; 17-Ketoestradiol	11	5.3–38	14
Estrone sulfate	E1S; Estrone 3-sulfate	2	0.004	0.002
Estrone glucuronide	E1G; Estrone 3-glucuronide	?	<0.001	0.0006
Ethinylestradiol	EE; 17α-Ethynylestradiol	100	17–150	129
Mestranol	EE 3-methyl ether	1	1.3–8.2	0.16
Quinestrol	EE 3-cyclopentyl ether	?	0.37	?
Footnotes: ^{a} = Relative binding affinities (RBAs) were determined via in-vitro displacement of labeled estradiol from estrogen receptors (ERs) generally of rodent uterine cytosol. Estrogen esters are variably hydrolyzed into estrogens in these systems (shorter ester chain length -> greater rate of hydrolysis) and the ER RBAs of the esters decrease strongly when hydrolysis is prevented. ^{b} = Relative estrogenic potencies (REPs) were calculated from half-maximal effective concentrations (EC_{50}) that were determined via in-vitro β‐galactosidase (β-gal) and green fluorescent protein (GFP) production assays in yeast expressing human ERα and human ERβ. Both mammalian cells and yeast have the capacity to hydrolyze estrogen esters. ^{c} = The affinities of estradiol cypionate for the ERs are similar to those of estradiol valerate and estradiol benzoate (figure). Sources: See template page.

== See also ==
- Estradiol stearate
- Estradiol undecylate
- List of estrogen esters § Estradiol esters
