= Estradiol stearate =

Chemical compound

Clinical data
- Trade names: Depofollan
- Other names: E2-17-St; Estradiol octadecanoate; Estradiol 17β-stearate; Estradiol 17β-octadecanoate
- Routes of administration: Intramuscular injection
- Drug class: Estrogen; Estrogen ester

Identifiers
- IUPAC name: [(8R,9S,13S,14S,17S)-3-Hydroxy-13-methyl-6,7,8,9,11,12,14,15,16,17-decahydrocyclopenta[a]phenanthren-17-yl] octadecanoate
- CAS Number: 82205-00-3
- PubChem CID: 67100
- ChemSpider: 60448
- UNII: 59G2KR8QBG
- CompTox Dashboard (EPA): DTXSID401002548

Chemical and physical data
- Formula: C_{36}H_{58}O_{3}
- Molar mass: 538.857 g·mol^{−1}
- 3D model (JSmol): Interactive image
- SMILES: CCCCCCCCCCCCCCCCCC(=O)O[C@H]1CC[C@H]2[C@@H]3CCc4cc(O)ccc4[C@H]3CC[C@]12C
- InChI: InChI=1S/C36H58O3/c1-3-4-5-6-7-8-9-10-11-12-13-14-15-16-17-18-35(38)39-34-24-23-33-32-21-19-28-27-29(37)20-22-30(28)31(32)25-26-36(33,34)2/h20,22,27,31-34,37H,3-19,21,23-26H2,1-2H3/t31-,32-,33+,34+,36+/m1/s1; Key:KIADYVOYCQRXRE-IMTRJTTHSA-N

Estradiol stearate (E2-17-St), also known as estradiol octadecanoate and sold under the brand name Depofollan, is a naturally occurring estrogen and an estrogen ester – specifically, the C17β stearate ester of estradiol. It occurs in the body as a very long-lasting metabolite and prohormone of estradiol. The compound is one of the components that collectively constitute lipoidal estradiol, another of which is estradiol palmitate. It is extremely lipophilic and hydrophobic. Estradiol stearate has no affinity for the estrogen receptor, requiring transformation into estradiol via esterases for its estrogenic activity. The compound does not bind to sex hormone-binding globulin or α-fetoprotein, instead being transported by lipoproteins such as high-density lipoprotein and low-density lipoprotein.

Estradiol stearate has a prolonged duration of action relative to estradiol regardless of whether it is given by intravenous injection or subcutaneous injection. This is in contrast to short-chain fatty acid esters of estradiol, such as estradiol benzoate, which do not show a prolonged duration with intravenous injection. When administered by intravenous injection in rodents, estradiol stearate has a greatly increased terminal half-life relative to estradiol (6 hours vs. 2 minutes). Estradiol stearate also had a half-life that was 60% longer than that of estradiol arachidonate, despite similar ester chain lengths. In contrast to the long-chain esters, the half-lives of short-chain estradiol esters such as estradiol acetate and estradiol hexanoate were the same as that of estradiol. As such, whereas short-chain estradiol esters are rapidly hydrolyzed, long-chain estradiol esters like estradiol stearate are resistant to metabolism. Thus, the prolongation of effect of short-chain estradiol esters is purely due to their increased lipophilicity and slow release from the injected depot, whereas the prolonged duration of long-chain estradiol esters is due both to this property and to their resistance to metabolism. Estradiol stearate is susceptible to first-pass metabolism in the liver, and hence has much greater potency by subcutaneous injection than by oral administration.

In addition to its endogenous role, estradiol stearate was previously available as a pharmaceutical drug for use via depot intramuscular injection. The medication was introduced between 1938 and 1941 under the brand name Depofollan. It has been used to treat prostate cancer. Estradiol stearate is a long-acting estrogen and is said to have been the first long-acting estrogen used in medicine, although it was never widely employed. It was reported to have a duration of more than one month. The medication was provided as an oil solution in ampoules containing 15 mg estradiol stearate. It was manufactured by Chinoin, a Hungarian pharmaceutical company. The compound was studied by Karl Miescher in 1938 and was patented by Miescher and Chinoin in 1939 and 1941, respectively. A similar clinically used long-acting estradiol ester is estradiol undecylate, which has 11 carbon atoms instead of the 18 carbon atoms in estradiol stearate.

Affinities and estrogenic potencies of estrogen esters and ethers at the estrogen receptors
Estrogen	Other names	RBA (%)^{a}	REP (%)^{b}	
Estrogen	Other names	ER	ERα	ERβ
Estradiol	E2	100	100	100
Estradiol 3-sulfate	E2S; E2-3S	?	0.02	0.04
Estradiol 3-glucuronide	E2-3G	?	0.02	0.09
Estradiol 17β-glucuronide	E2-17G	?	0.002	0.0002
Estradiol benzoate	EB; Estradiol 3-benzoate	10	1.1	0.52
Estradiol 17β-acetate	E2-17A	31–45	24	?
Estradiol diacetate	EDA; Estradiol 3,17β-diacetate	?	0.79	?
Estradiol propionate	EP; Estradiol 17β-propionate	19–26	2.6	?
Estradiol valerate	EV; Estradiol 17β-valerate	2–11	0.04–21	?
Estradiol cypionate	EC; Estradiol 17β-cypionate	?^{c}	4.0	?
Estradiol palmitate	Estradiol 17β-palmitate	0	?	?
Estradiol stearate	Estradiol 17β-stearate	0	?	?
Estrone	E1; 17-Ketoestradiol	11	5.3–38	14
Estrone sulfate	E1S; Estrone 3-sulfate	2	0.004	0.002
Estrone glucuronide	E1G; Estrone 3-glucuronide	?	<0.001	0.0006
Ethinylestradiol	EE; 17α-Ethynylestradiol	100	17–150	129
Mestranol	EE 3-methyl ether	1	1.3–8.2	0.16
Quinestrol	EE 3-cyclopentyl ether	?	0.37	?
Footnotes: ^{a} = Relative binding affinities (RBAs) were determined via in-vitro displacement of labeled estradiol from estrogen receptors (ERs) generally of rodent uterine cytosol. Estrogen esters are variably hydrolyzed into estrogens in these systems (shorter ester chain length -> greater rate of hydrolysis) and the ER RBAs of the esters decrease strongly when hydrolysis is prevented. ^{b} = Relative estrogenic potencies (REPs) were calculated from half-maximal effective concentrations (EC_{50}) that were determined via in-vitro β‐galactosidase (β-gal) and green fluorescent protein (GFP) production assays in yeast expressing human ERα and human ERβ. Both mammalian cells and yeast have the capacity to hydrolyze estrogen esters. ^{c} = The affinities of estradiol cypionate for the ERs are similar to those of estradiol valerate and estradiol benzoate (figure). Sources: See template page.

Structural properties of selected estradiol esters
Estrogen	Structure	Ester(s)				Relative mol. weight	Relative E2 content^{b}	log P^{c}
Estrogen	Structure	Position(s)	Moiet(ies)	Type	Length^{a}	Relative mol. weight	Relative E2 content^{b}	log P^{c}
Estradiol		–	–	–	–	1.00	1.00	4.0
Estradiol acetate		C3	Ethanoic acid	Straight-chain fatty acid	2	1.15	0.87	4.2
Estradiol benzoate		C3	Benzoic acid	Aromatic fatty acid	– (~4–5)	1.38	0.72	4.7
Estradiol dipropionate		C3, C17β	Propanoic acid (×2)	Straight-chain fatty acid	3 (×2)	1.41	0.71	4.9
Estradiol valerate		C17β	Pentanoic acid	Straight-chain fatty acid	5	1.31	0.76	5.6–6.3
Estradiol benzoate butyrate		C3, C17β	Benzoic acid, butyric acid	Mixed fatty acid	– (~6, 2)	1.64	0.61	6.3
Estradiol cypionate		C17β	Cyclopentylpropanoic acid	Cyclic fatty acid	– (~6)	1.46	0.69	6.9
Estradiol enanthate		C17β	Heptanoic acid	Straight-chain fatty acid	7	1.41	0.71	6.7–7.3
Estradiol dienanthate		C3, C17β	Heptanoic acid (×2)	Straight-chain fatty acid	7 (×2)	1.82	0.55	8.1–10.4
Estradiol undecylate		C17β	Undecanoic acid	Straight-chain fatty acid	11	1.62	0.62	9.2–9.8
Estradiol stearate		C17β	Octadecanoic acid	Straight-chain fatty acid	18	1.98	0.51	12.2–12.4
Estradiol distearate		C3, C17β	Octadecanoic acid (×2)	Straight-chain fatty acid	18 (×2)	2.96	0.34	20.2
Estradiol sulfate		C3	Sulfuric acid	Water-soluble conjugate	–	1.29	0.77	0.3–3.8
Estradiol glucuronide		C17β	Glucuronic acid	Water-soluble conjugate	–	1.65	0.61	2.1–2.7
Estramustine phosphate^{d}		C3, C17β	Normustine, phosphoric acid	Water-soluble conjugate	–	1.91	0.52	2.9–5.0
Polyestradiol phosphate^{e}		C3–C17β	Phosphoric acid	Water-soluble conjugate	–	1.23^{f}	0.81^{f}	2.9^{g}
Footnotes: ^{a} = Length of ester in carbon atoms for straight-chain fatty acids or approximate length of ester in carbon atoms for aromatic or cyclic fatty acids. ^{b} = Relative estradiol content by weight (i.e., relative estrogenic exposure). ^{c} = Experimental or predicted octanol/water partition coefficient (i.e., lipophilicity/hydrophobicity). Retrieved from PubChem, ChemSpider, and DrugBank. ^{d} = Also known as estradiol normustine phosphate. ^{e} = Polymer of estradiol phosphate (~13 repeat units). ^{f} = Relative molecular weight or estradiol content per repeat unit. ^{g} = log P of repeat unit (i.e., estradiol phosphate). Sources: See individual articles.

== See also ==
- List of estrogen esters § Estradiol esters
