= Estradiol diacetate =

Chemical compound

Clinical data
- Other names: EDA; Estradiol 3,17β-diacetate; NSC-106559
- Drug class: Estrogen; Estrogen ester

Identifiers
- IUPAC name: [(8R,9S,13S,14S,17S)-3-acetyloxy-13-methyl-6,7,8,9,11,12,14,15,16,17-decahydrocyclopenta[a]phenanthren-17-yl] acetate
- CAS Number: 3434-88-6
- PubChem CID: 66431
- ChemSpider: 59804
- UNII: X43EU3CQ8P
- ChEMBL: ChEMBL3138724
- CompTox Dashboard (EPA): DTXSID10955895
- ECHA InfoCard: 100.020.306

Chemical and physical data
- Formula: C_{22}H_{28}O_{4}
- Molar mass: 356.462 g·mol^{−1}
- 3D model (JSmol): Interactive image
- SMILES: CC(=O)O[C@H]1CC[C@@H]2[C@@]1(CC[C@H]3[C@H]2CCC4=C3C=CC(=C4)OC(=O)C)C
- InChI: InChI=1S/C22H28O4/c1-13(23)25-16-5-7-17-15(12-16)4-6-19-18(17)10-11-22(3)20(19)8-9-21(22)26-14(2)24/h5,7,12,18-21H,4,6,8-11H2,1-3H3/t18-,19-,20+,21+,22+/m1/s1; Key:VQHQLBARMFAKSV-AANPDWTMSA-N

Estradiol diacetate (EDA), or estradiol 3,17β-diacetate, is an estrogen and an estrogen ester—specifically, the C3 and C17β diacetate ester of estradiol—which was never marketed. It is related to the estradiol monoesters estradiol acetate (estradiol 3-acetate; Femtrace) and estradiol 17β-acetate.

Affinities and estrogenic potencies of estrogen esters and ethers at the estrogen receptors
Estrogen	Other names	RBA (%)^{a}	REP (%)^{b}	
Estrogen	Other names	ER	ERα	ERβ
Estradiol	E2	100	100	100
Estradiol 3-sulfate	E2S; E2-3S	?	0.02	0.04
Estradiol 3-glucuronide	E2-3G	?	0.02	0.09
Estradiol 17β-glucuronide	E2-17G	?	0.002	0.0002
Estradiol benzoate	EB; Estradiol 3-benzoate	10	1.1	0.52
Estradiol 17β-acetate	E2-17A	31–45	24	?
Estradiol diacetate	EDA; Estradiol 3,17β-diacetate	?	0.79	?
Estradiol propionate	EP; Estradiol 17β-propionate	19–26	2.6	?
Estradiol valerate	EV; Estradiol 17β-valerate	2–11	0.04–21	?
Estradiol cypionate	EC; Estradiol 17β-cypionate	?^{c}	4.0	?
Estradiol palmitate	Estradiol 17β-palmitate	0	?	?
Estradiol stearate	Estradiol 17β-stearate	0	?	?
Estrone	E1; 17-Ketoestradiol	11	5.3–38	14
Estrone sulfate	E1S; Estrone 3-sulfate	2	0.004	0.002
Estrone glucuronide	E1G; Estrone 3-glucuronide	?	<0.001	0.0006
Ethinylestradiol	EE; 17α-Ethynylestradiol	100	17–150	129
Mestranol	EE 3-methyl ether	1	1.3–8.2	0.16
Quinestrol	EE 3-cyclopentyl ether	?	0.37	?
Footnotes: ^{a} = Relative binding affinities (RBAs) were determined via in-vitro displacement of labeled estradiol from estrogen receptors (ERs) generally of rodent uterine cytosol. Estrogen esters are variably hydrolyzed into estrogens in these systems (shorter ester chain length -> greater rate of hydrolysis) and the ER RBAs of the esters decrease strongly when hydrolysis is prevented. ^{b} = Relative estrogenic potencies (REPs) were calculated from half-maximal effective concentrations (EC_{50}) that were determined via in-vitro β‐galactosidase (β-gal) and green fluorescent protein (GFP) production assays in yeast expressing human ERα and human ERβ. Both mammalian cells and yeast have the capacity to hydrolyze estrogen esters. ^{c} = The affinities of estradiol cypionate for the ERs are similar to those of estradiol valerate and estradiol benzoate (figure). Sources: See template page.

== See also ==
- List of estrogen esters § Estradiol esters
