= Mestranol =

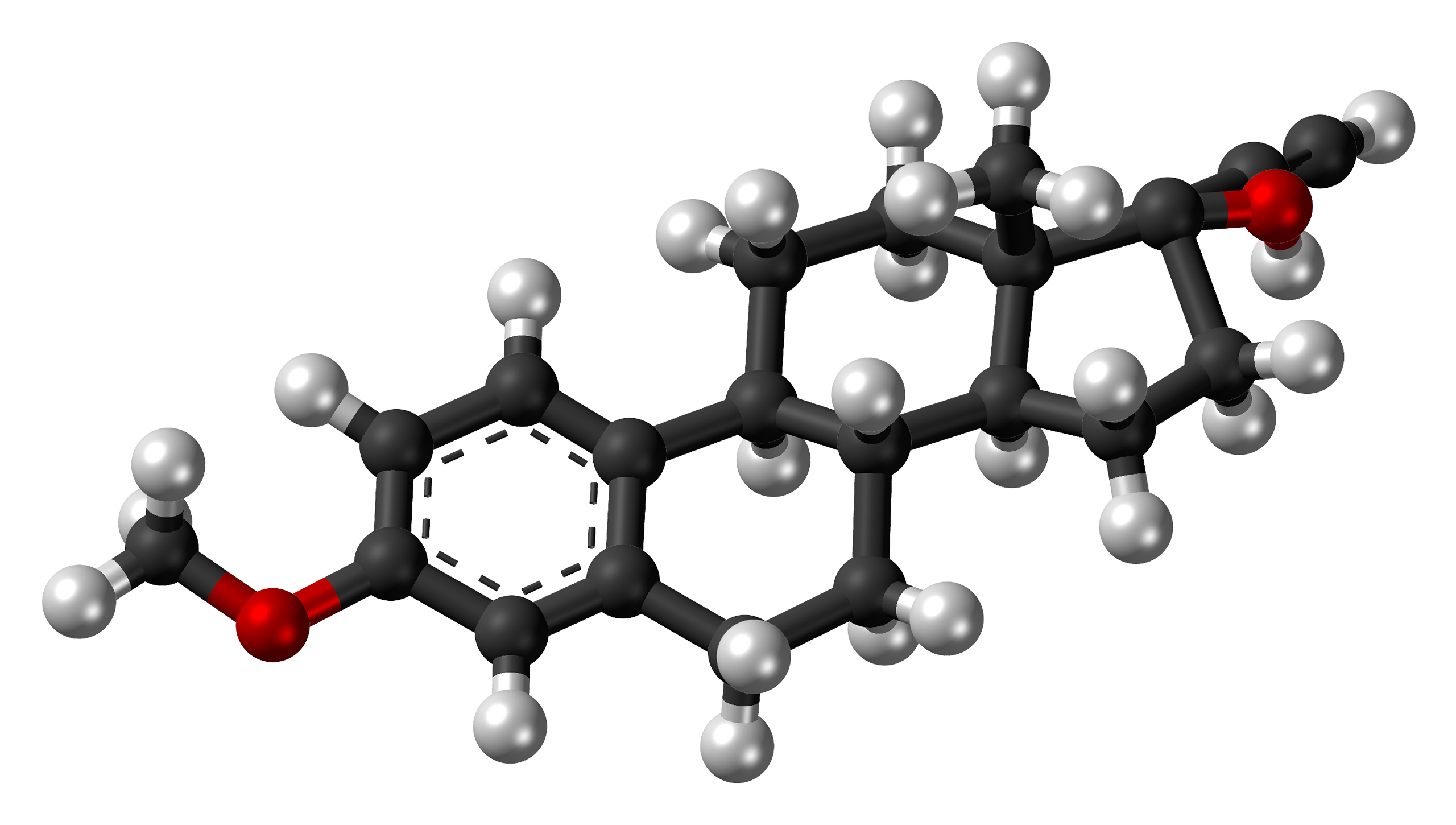

Clinical data
- Trade names: Enovid, Norinyl, Ortho-Novum, others
- Other names: Ethinylestradiol 3-methyl ether; EEME; EE3ME; CB-8027; L-33355; RS-1044; 17α-Ethynylestradiol 3-methyl ether; 17α-Ethynyl-3-methoxyestra-1,3,5(10)-trien-17β-ol; 3-Methoxy-19-norpregna-1,3,5(10)-trien-20-yn-17β-ol
- AHFS/Drugs.com: International Drug Names
- MedlinePlus: a601050
- Routes of administration: By mouth
- Drug class: Estrogen; Estrogen ether
- ATC code: None

Legal status
- Legal status: In general: ℞ (Prescription only)

Pharmacokinetic data
- Metabolites: Ethinylestradiol
- Elimination half-life: Mestranol: 50 min EE: 7–36 hours

Identifiers
- IUPAC name: (8R,9S,13S,14S,17R)-17-ethynyl-3-methoxy-13-methyl-7,8,9,11,12,14,15,16-octahydro-6H-cyclopenta[a]phenanthren-17-ol
- CAS Number: 72-33-3
- PubChem CID: 6291
- IUPHAR/BPS: 7087
- DrugBank: DB01357
- ChemSpider: 6054
- UNII: B2V233XGE7
- KEGG: D00575
- ChEBI: CHEBI:6784
- ChEMBL: ChEMBL1201151
- CompTox Dashboard (EPA): DTXSID0020814
- ECHA InfoCard: 100.000.707

Chemical and physical data
- Formula: C_{21}H_{26}O_{2}
- Molar mass: 310.437 g·mol^{−1}
- 3D model (JSmol): Interactive image
- SMILES: O(c1cc4c(cc1)[C@H]3CC[C@]2([C@@H](CC[C@]2(C#C)O)[C@@H]3CC4)C)C
- InChI: InChI=1S/C21H26O2/c1-4-21(22)12-10-19-18-7-5-14-13-15(23-3)6-8-16(14)17(18)9-11-20(19,21)2/h1,6,8,13,17-19,22H,5,7,9-12H2,2-3H3/t17-,18-,19+,20+,21+/m1/s1; Key:IMSSROKUHAOUJS-MJCUULBUSA-N

Mestranol, sold under the brand names Enovid, Norinyl, and Ortho-Novum among others, is an estrogen medication which has been used in birth control pills, menopausal hormone therapy, and the treatment of menstrual disorders. It is formulated in combination with a progestin and is not available alone. It is taken by mouth.

Side effects of mestranol include nausea, breast tension, edema, and breakthrough bleeding among others. It is an estrogen, or an agonist of the estrogen receptors, the biological target of estrogens like estradiol. Mestranol is a prodrug of ethinylestradiol in the body.

Mestranol was discovered in 1956 and was introduced for medical use in 1957. It was the estrogen component in the first birth control pill. In 1969, mestranol was replaced by ethinylestradiol in most birth control pills, although mestranol continues to be used in a few birth control pills even today. Mestranol remains available only in a few countries, including the United States, United Kingdom, Japan, and Chile.

== Medical uses ==
Mestranol was employed as the estrogen component in many of the first oral contraceptives, such as mestranol/noretynodrel (brand name Enovid) and mestranol/norethisterone (brand names Ortho-Novum, Norinyl), and is still in use today. In addition to its use as an oral contraceptive, mestranol has been used as a component of menopausal hormone therapy for the treatment of menopausal symptoms.

== Pharmacology ==
Ethinylestradiol (EE), the active form of mestranol

Mestranol is a biologically inactive prodrug of ethinylestradiol to which it is demethylated in the liver (via O-Dealkylation) with a conversion efficiency of 70% (50 μg of mestranol is pharmacokinetically bioequivalent to 35 μg of ethinylestradiol). It has been found to possess 0.1–2.3% of the relative binding affinity of estradiol (100%) for the estrogen receptor, compared to 75–190% for ethinylestradiol.

The elimination half-life of mestranol has been reported to be 50 minutes. The elimination half-life of the active form of mestranol, ethinylestradiol, is 7 to 36 hours.

The effective ovulation-inhibiting dosage of mestranol has been studied in women. It has been reported to be about 98% effective at inhibiting ovulation at a dosage of 75 or 80 μg/day. In another study, the ovulation rate was 15.4% at 50 μg/day, 5.7% at 80 μg/day, and 1.1% at 100 μg/day.

Affinities and estrogenic potencies of estrogen esters and ethers at the estrogen receptors
Estrogen	Other names	RBA (%)^{a}	REP (%)^{b}	
Estrogen	Other names	ER	ERα	ERβ
Estradiol	E2	100	100	100
Estradiol 3-sulfate	E2S; E2-3S	?	0.02	0.04
Estradiol 3-glucuronide	E2-3G	?	0.02	0.09
Estradiol 17β-glucuronide	E2-17G	?	0.002	0.0002
Estradiol benzoate	EB; Estradiol 3-benzoate	10	1.1	0.52
Estradiol 17β-acetate	E2-17A	31–45	24	?
Estradiol diacetate	EDA; Estradiol 3,17β-diacetate	?	0.79	?
Estradiol propionate	EP; Estradiol 17β-propionate	19–26	2.6	?
Estradiol valerate	EV; Estradiol 17β-valerate	2–11	0.04–21	?
Estradiol cypionate	EC; Estradiol 17β-cypionate	?^{c}	4.0	?
Estradiol palmitate	Estradiol 17β-palmitate	0	?	?
Estradiol stearate	Estradiol 17β-stearate	0	?	?
Estrone	E1; 17-Ketoestradiol	11	5.3–38	14
Estrone sulfate	E1S; Estrone 3-sulfate	2	0.004	0.002
Estrone glucuronide	E1G; Estrone 3-glucuronide	?	<0.001	0.0006
Ethinylestradiol	EE; 17α-Ethynylestradiol	100	17–150	129
Mestranol	EE 3-methyl ether	1	1.3–8.2	0.16
Quinestrol	EE 3-cyclopentyl ether	?	0.37	?
Footnotes: ^{a} = Relative binding affinities (RBAs) were determined via in-vitro displacement of labeled estradiol from estrogen receptors (ERs) generally of rodent uterine cytosol. Estrogen esters are variably hydrolyzed into estrogens in these systems (shorter ester chain length -> greater rate of hydrolysis) and the ER RBAs of the esters decrease strongly when hydrolysis is prevented. ^{b} = Relative estrogenic potencies (REPs) were calculated from half-maximal effective concentrations (EC_{50}) that were determined via in-vitro β‐galactosidase (β-gal) and green fluorescent protein (GFP) production assays in yeast expressing human ERα and human ERβ. Both mammalian cells and yeast have the capacity to hydrolyze estrogen esters. ^{c} = The affinities of estradiol cypionate for the ERs are similar to those of estradiol valerate and estradiol benzoate (figure). Sources: See template page.

Potencies of oral estrogens
Compound	Dosage for specific uses (mg usually) (Note: Dosages are given in milligrams unless otherwise noted.)					
Compound	ETD (Note: Dosed every 2 to 3 weeks)	EPD	MSD	MSD (Note: Dosed daily)	OID	TSD
Estradiol (non-micronized)	30	≥120–300	120	6	-	-
Estradiol (micronized)	6–12	60–80	14–42	1–2	>5	>8
Estradiol valerate	6–12	60–80	14–42	1–2	-	>8
Estradiol benzoate	-	60–140	-	-	-	-
Estriol	≥20	120–150 (Note: In divided doses, 3x/day; irregular and atypical proliferation.)	28–126	1–6	>5	-
Estriol succinate	-	140–150	28–126	2–6	-	-
Estrone sulfate	12	60	42	2	-	-
Conjugated estrogens	5–12	60–80	8.4–25	0.625–1.25	>3.75	7.5
Ethinylestradiol	200 μg	1–2	280 μg	20–40 μg	100 μg	100 μg
Mestranol	300 μg	1.5–3.0	300–600 μg	25–30 μg	>80 μg	-
Quinestrol	300 μg	2–4	500 μg	25–50 μg	-	-
Methylestradiol	-	2	-	-	-	-
Diethylstilbestrol	2.5	20–30	11	0.5–2.0	>5	3
DES dipropionate	-	15–30	-	-	-	-
Dienestrol	5	30–40	42	0.5–4.0	-	-
Dienestrol diacetate	3–5	30–60	-	-	-	-
Hexestrol	-	70–110	-	-	-	-
Chlorotrianisene	-	>100	-	-	>48	-
Methallenestril	-	400	-	-	-	-
Sources and footnotes:

== Chemistry ==
Mestranol, also known as ethinylestradiol 3-methyl ether (EEME) or as 17α-ethynyl-3-methoxyestra-1,3,5(10)-trien-17β-ol, is a synthetic estrane steroid and a derivative of estradiol. It is specifically a derivative of ethinylestradiol (17α-ethynylestradiol) with a methyl ether at the C3 position.

== History ==
In April 1956, noretynodrel was investigated, in Puerto Rico, in the first large-scale clinical trial of a progestogen as an oral contraceptive. The trial was conducted in Puerto Rico due to the high birth rate in the country and concerns of moral censure in the United States. It was discovered early into the study that the initial chemical syntheses of noretynodrel had been contaminated with small amounts (1–2%) of the 3-methyl ether of ethinylestradiol (noretynodrel having been synthesized from ethinylestradiol). When this impurity was removed, higher rates of breakthrough bleeding occurred. As a result, mestranol, that same year (1956), was developed and serendipitously identified as a very potent synthetic estrogen (and eventually as a prodrug of ethinylestradiol), given its name, and added back to the formulation. This resulted in Enovid by G. D. Searle & Company, the first oral contraceptive and a combination of 9.85 mg noretynodrel and 150 μg mestranol per pill.

Around 1969, mestranol was replaced by ethinylestradiol in most combined oral contraceptives due to widespread panic about the recently uncovered increased risk of venous thromboembolism with estrogen-containing oral contraceptives. The rationale was that ethinylestradiol was approximately twice as potent by weight as mestranol and hence that the dose could be halved, which it was thought might result in a lower incidence of venous thromboembolism. Whether this actually did result in a lower incidence of venous thromboembolism has never been assessed.

== Society and culture ==
=== Generic names ===
Mestranol is the generic name of the drug and its INN, USAN, USP, BAN, DCF, and JAN, while mestranolo is its DCIT.

=== Brand names ===
Mestranol has been marketed under a variety of brand names, mostly or exclusively in combination with progestins, including Devocin, Enavid, Enovid, Femigen, Mestranol, Norbiogest, Ortho-Novin, Ortho-Novum, Ovastol, and Tranel among others. Today, it continues to be sold in combination with progestins under brand names including Lutedion, Necon, Norinyl, Ortho-Novum, and Sophia.

=== Availability ===
Mestranol remains available only in the United States, the United Kingdom, Japan, and Chile. It is only marketed in combination with progestins, such as norethisterone.

== Research ==
Mestranol has been studied as a male contraceptive and was found to be highly effective. At a dosage of 0.45 mg/day, it suppressed gonadotropin levels, reduced sperm count to zero within 4 to 6 weeks, and decreased libido, erectile function, and testicular size. Gynecomastia occurred in all of the men. These findings contributed to the conclusion that estrogens would be unacceptable as contraceptives for men.

== Environmental presence ==
In 2021, mestranol was one of the 12 compounds identified in sludge samples taken from 12 wastewater treatment plants in California that were collectively associated with estrogenic activity in in vitro.
