= Quinestrol =

Pharmaceutical drug

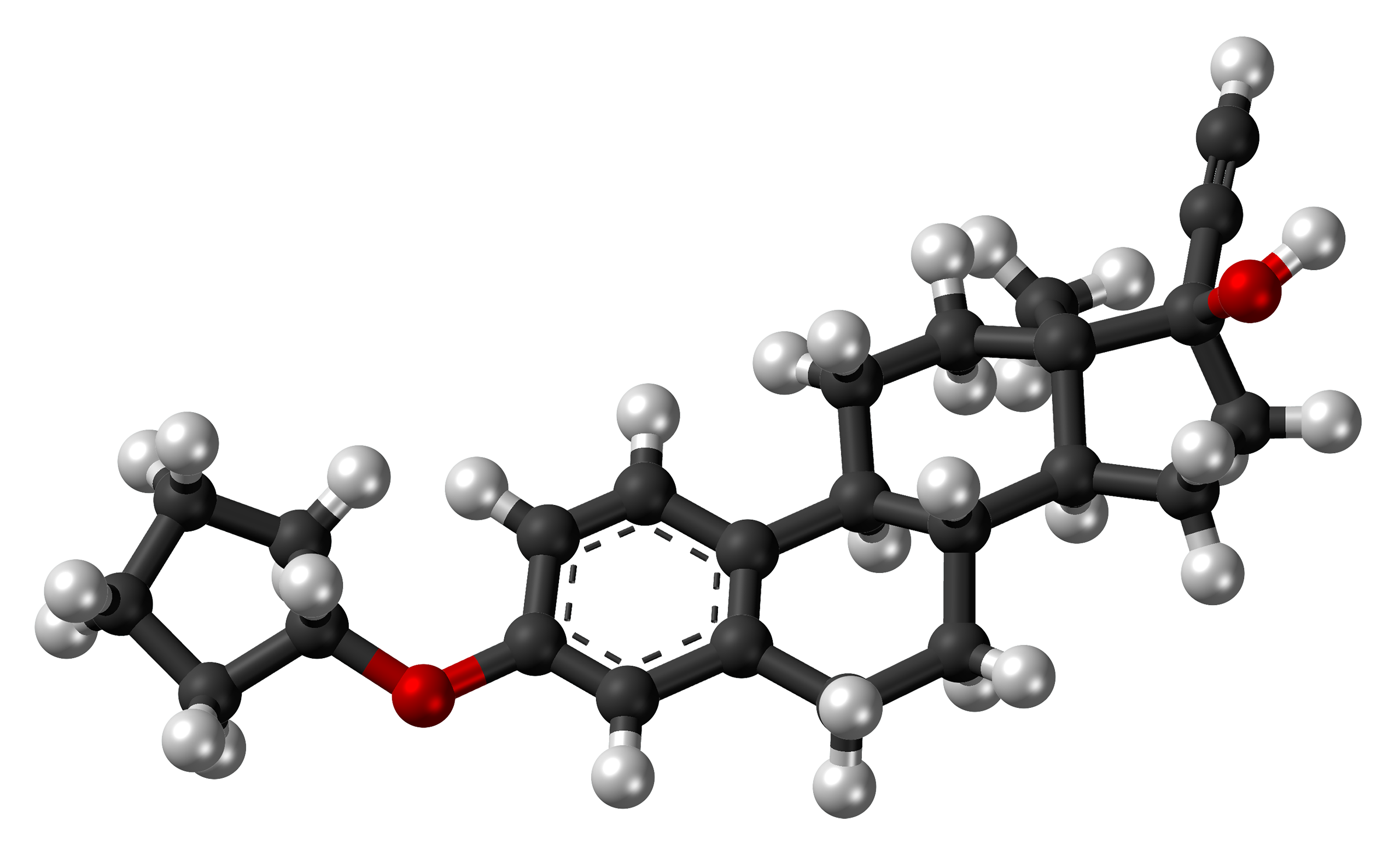

Clinical data
- Trade names: Estrovis, others
- Other names: Quinoestrol; Quinestrenol; Quinoestrenol; Ethinylestradiol 3-cyclopentyl ether; EECPE; EE2CPE; W-3566; 3-(Cyclopentyloxy)-17α-ethynylestra-1,3,5(10)-trien-17β-ol
- AHFS/Drugs.com: Micromedex Detailed Consumer Information
- Routes of administration: By mouth
- Drug class: Estrogen; Estrogen ether
- ATC code: None

Pharmacokinetic data
- Elimination half-life: >120 hours (>5 days)

Identifiers
- IUPAC name: (8R,9S,13S,14S,17R)-3-cyclopentyloxy-17-ethynyl-13-methyl-7,8,9,11,12,14,15,16-octahydro-6H-cyclopenta[a]phenanthren-17-ol
- CAS Number: 152-43-2
- PubChem CID: 9046
- IUPHAR/BPS: 7097
- DrugBank: DB04575
- ChemSpider: 8694
- UNII: JR0N7XD5GZ
- KEGG: D00576
- ChEBI: CHEBI:8716
- ChEMBL: ChEMBL1201165
- CompTox Dashboard (EPA): DTXSID6046553
- ECHA InfoCard: 100.005.277

Chemical and physical data
- Formula: C_{25}H_{32}O_{2}
- Molar mass: 364.529 g·mol^{−1}
- 3D model (JSmol): Interactive image
- SMILES: O(c1ccc2c(c1)CC[C@H]3[C@@H]4CC[C@](C#C)(O)[C@@]4(C)CC[C@H]23)C5CCCC5
- InChI: InChI=1S/C25H32O2/c1-3-25(26)15-13-23-22-10-8-17-16-19(27-18-6-4-5-7-18)9-11-20(17)21(22)12-14-24(23,25)2/h1,9,11,16,18,21-23,26H,4-8,10,12-15H2,2H3/t21-,22-,23+,24+,25+/m1/s1; Key:PWZUUYSISTUNDW-VAFBSOEGSA-N

Quinestrol, also known as ethinylestradiol cyclopentyl ether (EECPE), sold under the brand name Estrovis among others, is an estrogen medication which has been used in menopausal hormone therapy, hormonal birth control, and to treat breast cancer and prostate cancer. It is taken once per week to once per month by mouth.

== Medical uses ==
Quinestrol has been used as the estrogen component in menopausal hormone therapy and in combined hormonal birth control. It has also occasionally been used in the treatment of breast cancer and prostate cancer, as well as to suppress lactation. On its own as an estrogen, quinestrol was taken once per week by mouth. As a combined birth control pill, it was used together with quingestanol acetate and was taken once per month by mouth.

== Pharmacology ==
Ethinylestradiol (EE), the active form of quinestrol.

Quinestrol is a prodrug of ethinylestradiol (EE), with no estrogenic activity of its own. It is taken orally and has prolonged activity following a single dose, with a very long biological half-life of more than 120 hours (5 days) due to enhanced lipophilicity and storage in fat. Because of its much longer half-life, quinestrol is two to three times as potent as EE. Also because of its long half-life, quinestrol can be taken once a week or once a month.

Following administration, quinestrol is absorbed via the lymphatic system, is stored in adipose tissue, and is gradually released from adipose tissue.

Affinities and estrogenic potencies of estrogen esters and ethers at the estrogen receptors
Estrogen	Other names	RBA (%)^{a}	REP (%)^{b}	
Estrogen	Other names	ER	ERα	ERβ
Estradiol	E2	100	100	100
Estradiol 3-sulfate	E2S; E2-3S	?	0.02	0.04
Estradiol 3-glucuronide	E2-3G	?	0.02	0.09
Estradiol 17β-glucuronide	E2-17G	?	0.002	0.0002
Estradiol benzoate	EB; Estradiol 3-benzoate	10	1.1	0.52
Estradiol 17β-acetate	E2-17A	31–45	24	?
Estradiol diacetate	EDA; Estradiol 3,17β-diacetate	?	0.79	?
Estradiol propionate	EP; Estradiol 17β-propionate	19–26	2.6	?
Estradiol valerate	EV; Estradiol 17β-valerate	2–11	0.04–21	?
Estradiol cypionate	EC; Estradiol 17β-cypionate	?^{c}	4.0	?
Estradiol palmitate	Estradiol 17β-palmitate	0	?	?
Estradiol stearate	Estradiol 17β-stearate	0	?	?
Estrone	E1; 17-Ketoestradiol	11	5.3–38	14
Estrone sulfate	E1S; Estrone 3-sulfate	2	0.004	0.002
Estrone glucuronide	E1G; Estrone 3-glucuronide	?	<0.001	0.0006
Ethinylestradiol	EE; 17α-Ethynylestradiol	100	17–150	129
Mestranol	EE 3-methyl ether	1	1.3–8.2	0.16
Quinestrol	EE 3-cyclopentyl ether	?	0.37	?
Footnotes: ^{a} = Relative binding affinities (RBAs) were determined via in-vitro displacement of labeled estradiol from estrogen receptors (ERs) generally of rodent uterine cytosol. Estrogen esters are variably hydrolyzed into estrogens in these systems (shorter ester chain length -> greater rate of hydrolysis) and the ER RBAs of the esters decrease strongly when hydrolysis is prevented. ^{b} = Relative estrogenic potencies (REPs) were calculated from half-maximal effective concentrations (EC_{50}) that were determined via in-vitro β‐galactosidase (β-gal) and green fluorescent protein (GFP) production assays in yeast expressing human ERα and human ERβ. Both mammalian cells and yeast have the capacity to hydrolyze estrogen esters. ^{c} = The affinities of estradiol cypionate for the ERs are similar to those of estradiol valerate and estradiol benzoate (figure). Sources: See template page.

Potencies of oral estrogens
Compound	Dosage for specific uses (mg usually) (Note: Dosages are given in milligrams unless otherwise noted.)					
Compound	ETD (Note: Dosed every 2 to 3 weeks)	EPD	MSD	MSD (Note: Dosed daily)	OID	TSD
Estradiol (non-micronized)	30	≥120–300	120	6	-	-
Estradiol (micronized)	6–12	60–80	14–42	1–2	>5	>8
Estradiol valerate	6–12	60–80	14–42	1–2	-	>8
Estradiol benzoate	-	60–140	-	-	-	-
Estriol	≥20	120–150 (Note: In divided doses, 3x/day; irregular and atypical proliferation.)	28–126	1–6	>5	-
Estriol succinate	-	140–150	28–126	2–6	-	-
Estrone sulfate	12	60	42	2	-	-
Conjugated estrogens	5–12	60–80	8.4–25	0.625–1.25	>3.75	7.5
Ethinylestradiol	200 μg	1–2	280 μg	20–40 μg	100 μg	100 μg
Mestranol	300 μg	1.5–3.0	300–600 μg	25–30 μg	>80 μg	-
Quinestrol	300 μg	2–4	500 μg	25–50 μg	-	-
Methylestradiol	-	2	-	-	-	-
Diethylstilbestrol	2.5	20–30	11	0.5–2.0	>5	3
DES dipropionate	-	15–30	-	-	-	-
Dienestrol	5	30–40	42	0.5–4.0	-	-
Dienestrol diacetate	3–5	30–60	-	-	-	-
Hexestrol	-	70–110	-	-	-	-
Chlorotrianisene	-	>100	-	-	>48	-
Methallenestril	-	400	-	-	-	-
Sources and footnotes:

== Chemistry ==
Quinestrol, also known as ethinylestradiol 3-cyclopentyl ether (EE2CPE), is a synthetic estrane steroid and a derivative of estradiol. It is an estrogen ether, specifically the C3 cyclopentyl ether of ethinylestradiol (17α-ethynylestradiol). Closely related estrogens include mestranol (ethinylestradiol 3-methyl ether) and ethinylestradiol sulfonate (EES; Turisteron; ethinylestradiol 3-isopropylsulfonate).

== History ==
Quinestrol was developed and introduced for medical use in the 1960s.

== Society and culture ==
=== Generic names ===
Quinestrol is the generic name of the drug and its INN, USAN, and BAN. It is also known by its former developmental code name W-3566.

=== Brand names ===
Quinestrol has been marketed under brand names including Agalacto-Quilea, Basaquines, Eston, Estrovis, Estrovister, Plestrovis, Qui-Lea, Soluna, and Yueketing, among others.

=== Availability ===
Quinestrol was marketed as Estrovis in the United States by Parke-Davis and as Qui-Lea in Argentina, but is reportedly not currently marketed. However, it does appear to still be available as an oral contraceptive in combination with progestins in Argentina and China.

One tablet form available in China consists of 6 mg levonorgestrel and 3 mg quinestrol; it is used as a prescription "long-term" oral contraceptive, with one dose taken each month. It is sold under various brand names including Yuèkětíng (Chinese: 悦可婷) and Àiyuè (Chinese: 艾悦). A version with the racemic norgestrel in place of levonorgestrel also appears to be available.

== Veterinary use ==
=== Rodents ===
The Chinese levonorgestrel/quinestrol 2:1 formula is known as EP-1 in veterinary practice. It is known to have some organ-specific effects on the Mongolian gerbil as measured by receptor mRNA expression. Incorporated into baits at a concentration of 50 ppm, EP-1 has been used to control wild Mongolian gerbil populations with some success.
