= Estradiol 3-glucuronide =

Names
- IUPAC name 17β-Hydroxyestra-1,3,5(10)-trien-3-yl β-D-glucopyranosiduronic acid
- Systematic IUPAC name (2S,3S,4S,5R,6S)-3,4,5-Trihydroxy-6-{[(1S,3aS,3bR,9bS,11aS)-1-hydroxy-11a-methyl-2,3,3a,3b,4,5,9b,10,11,11a-decahydro-1H-cyclopenta[a]phenanthren-7-yl]oxy}oxane-2-carboxylic acid
- Other names E2-3G; 17β-Estradiol 3-(β-D-glucuronide)

Identifiers
CAS Number	15270-30-1
3D model (JSmol)	Interactive image
ChEBI	CHEBI:36489
ChEMBL	ChEMBL2074591
ChemSpider	389587
KEGG	C05503
PubChem CID	440713
UNII	32835P5TLT
CompTox Dashboard (EPA)	DTXSID60934579
- InChI: InChI=1S/C24H32O8/c1-24-9-8-14-13-5-3-12(10-11(13)2-4-15(14)16(24)6-7-17(24)25)31-23-20(28)18(26)19(27)21(32-23)22(29)30/h3,5,10,14-21,23,25-28H,2,4,6-9H2,1H3,(H,29,30)/t14-,15-,16+,17+,18+,19+,20-,21+,23-,24+/m1/s1 Key: MUOHJTRCBBDUOW-QXYWQCSFSA-N
- SMILES: C[C@]12CC[C@H]3[C@H]([C@@H]1CC[C@@H]2O)CCC4=C3C=CC(=C4)O[C@H]5[C@@H]([C@H]([C@@H]([C@H](O5)C(=O)O)O)O)O

Properties
Chemical formula	C_{24}H_{32}O_{8}
Molar mass	448.512 g/mol
- Except where otherwise noted, data are given for materials in their standard state (at 25 °C [77 °F], 100 kPa). Infobox references

Estradiol 3-glucuronide (E2-3G), also known as 17β-estradiol 3-(β-D-glucuronide), is a naturally occurring and endogenous estrogen conjugate. It is specifically the C3 glucuronide conjugate of estradiol the major estrogen in the body. It is formed from estradiol in the liver by UDP-glucuronosyltransferase via attachment of glucuronic acid and is eventually excreted in urine and bile.

estradiol
+ UDP-glucuronate
UDP
estradiol 3-glucuronide

Similarly to estrogen sulfates like estrone sulfate, estrogen glucuronides have much higher water solubility than do unconjugated estrogens like estradiol.

Estrogen glucuronides can be deconjugated into the corresponding free estrogens by β-glucuronidase in tissues that express this enzyme, such as the mammary gland. As a result, estrogen glucuronides have estrogenic activity via conversion into estrogens.

Estradiol 3-glucuronide is a positional isomer of estradiol 17β-glucuronide.

Affinities and estrogenic potencies of estrogen esters and ethers at the estrogen receptors
Estrogen	Other names	RBA (%)^{a}	REP (%)^{b}	
Estrogen	Other names	ER	ERα	ERβ
Estradiol	E2	100	100	100
Estradiol 3-sulfate	E2S; E2-3S	?	0.02	0.04
Estradiol 3-glucuronide	E2-3G	?	0.02	0.09
Estradiol 17β-glucuronide	E2-17G	?	0.002	0.0002
Estradiol benzoate	EB; Estradiol 3-benzoate	10	1.1	0.52
Estradiol 17β-acetate	E2-17A	31–45	24	?
Estradiol diacetate	EDA; Estradiol 3,17β-diacetate	?	0.79	?
Estradiol propionate	EP; Estradiol 17β-propionate	19–26	2.6	?
Estradiol valerate	EV; Estradiol 17β-valerate	2–11	0.04–21	?
Estradiol cypionate	EC; Estradiol 17β-cypionate	?^{c}	4.0	?
Estradiol palmitate	Estradiol 17β-palmitate	0	?	?
Estradiol stearate	Estradiol 17β-stearate	0	?	?
Estrone	E1; 17-Ketoestradiol	11	5.3–38	14
Estrone sulfate	E1S; Estrone 3-sulfate	2	0.004	0.002
Estrone glucuronide	E1G; Estrone 3-glucuronide	?	<0.001	0.0006
Ethinylestradiol	EE; 17α-Ethynylestradiol	100	17–150	129
Mestranol	EE 3-methyl ether	1	1.3–8.2	0.16
Quinestrol	EE 3-cyclopentyl ether	?	0.37	?
Footnotes: ^{a} = Relative binding affinities (RBAs) were determined via in-vitro displacement of labeled estradiol from estrogen receptors (ERs) generally of rodent uterine cytosol. Estrogen esters are variably hydrolyzed into estrogens in these systems (shorter ester chain length -> greater rate of hydrolysis) and the ER RBAs of the esters decrease strongly when hydrolysis is prevented. ^{b} = Relative estrogenic potencies (REPs) were calculated from half-maximal effective concentrations (EC_{50}) that were determined via in-vitro β‐galactosidase (β-gal) and green fluorescent protein (GFP) production assays in yeast expressing human ERα and human ERβ. Both mammalian cells and yeast have the capacity to hydrolyze estrogen esters. ^{c} = The affinities of estradiol cypionate for the ERs are similar to those of estradiol valerate and estradiol benzoate (figure). Sources: See template page.

== See also ==
- Catechol estrogen
- Estradiol sulfate
- Estriol glucuronide
- Estriol sulfate
- Estrogen conjugate
- Lipoidal estradiol
