= Estrone =

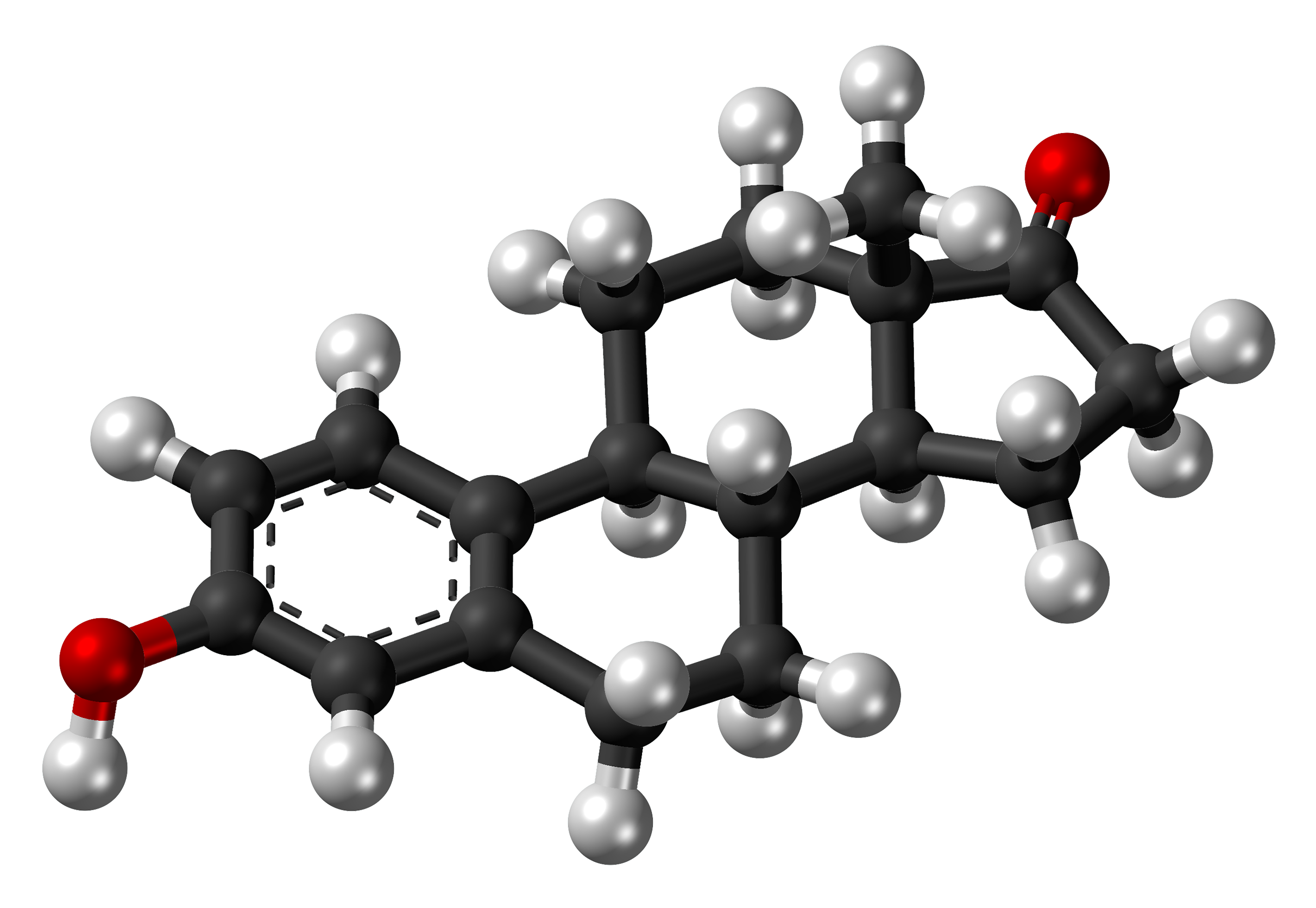

Names
- IUPAC name 3-Hydroxyestra-1,3,5(10)-trien-17-one
- Systematic IUPAC name (3aS,3bR,9bS,11aS)-7-Hydroxy-11a-methyl-2,3,3a,3b,4,5,9b,10,11,11a-decahydro-1H-cyclopenta[a]phenanthren-1-one
- Other names Oestrone; E1

Identifiers
CAS Number	53-16-7
3D model (JSmol)	Interactive image
ChEBI	CHEBI:17263
ChEMBL	ChEMBL1405
ChemSpider	5660
ECHA InfoCard	100.000.150
KEGG	D00067
PubChem CID	5870
UNII	2DI9HA706A
CompTox Dashboard (EPA)	DTXSID4022367
- InChI: InChI=1S/C18H22O2/c1-18-9-8-14-13-5-3-12(19)10-11(13)2-4-15(14)16(18)6-7-17(18)20/h3,5,10,14-16,19H,2,4,6-9H2,1H3/t14-,15-,16+,18+/m1/s1 Key: DNXHEGUUPJUMQT-CBZIJGRNSA-N
- SMILES: Oc1ccc2[C@H]3CC[C@]4(C)C(CC[C@H]4[C@@H]3CCc2c1)=O

Properties
Chemical formula	C_{18}H_{22}O_{2}
Molar mass	270.372 g/mol
Melting point	254.5
- Except where otherwise noted, data are given for materials in their standard state (at 25 °C [77 °F], 100 kPa). Infobox references

Estrone (E1), also spelled oestrone, is a steroid, a weak estrogen, and a minor female sex hormone. It is one of three major endogenous estrogens, the others being estradiol and estriol. Estrone, as well as the other estrogens, are synthesized from cholesterol and secreted mainly from the gonads, though they can also be formed from adrenal androgens in adipose tissue. Relative to estradiol, both estrone and estriol have far weaker activity as estrogens. Estrone can be converted into estradiol, and serves mainly as a precursor or metabolic intermediate of estradiol. It is both a precursor and metabolite of estradiol.

In addition to its role as a natural hormone, estrone has been used as a medication, for instance in menopausal hormone therapy; for information on estrone as a medication, see the estrone (medication) article.

== Biological activity ==
Estrone is an estrogen, specifically an agonist of the estrogen receptors ERα and ERβ. It is a far less potent estrogen than is estradiol, and as such, is a relatively weak estrogen. Given by subcutaneous injection in mice, estradiol is about 10-fold more potent than estrone and about 100-fold more potent than estriol. According to one study, the relative binding affinities of estrone for the human ERα and ERβ were 4.0% and 3.5% of those of estradiol, respectively, and the relative transactivational capacities of estrone at the ERα and ERβ were 2.6% and 4.3% of those of estradiol, respectively. In accordance, the estrogenic activity of estrone has been reported to be approximately 4% of that of estradiol. In addition to its low estrogenic potency, estrone, unlike estradiol and estriol, is not accumulated in estrogen target tissues. Because estrone can be transformed into estradiol, most or all of the estrogenic potency of estrone in vivo is actually due to conversion into estradiol. As such, estrone is considered to be a precursor or prohormone of estradiol. In contrast to estradiol and estriol, estrone is not a ligand of the G protein-coupled estrogen receptor (affinity >10,000 nM).

Clinical research has confirmed the nature of estrone as a relatively inert precursor of estradiol. With oral administration of estradiol, the ratio of estradiol levels to estrone levels is about 5 times higher on average than under normal physiological circumstances in premenopausal women and with parenteral (non-oral) routes of estradiol. Oral administration of menopausal replacement dosages of estradiol results in low, follicular phase levels of estradiol, whereas estrone levels resemble the high levels seen during the first trimester of pregnancy. In spite of markedly elevated levels of estrone with oral estradiol but not with transdermal estradiol, clinical studies have shown that dosages of oral and transdermal estradiol achieving similar levels of estradiol possess equivalent and non-significantly different potency in terms of measures including suppression of luteinizing hormone and follicle-stimulating hormone levels, inhibition of bone resorption, and relief of menopausal symptoms such as hot flashes. In addition, estradiol levels were found to correlate with these effects, while estrone levels did not. These findings confirm that estrone has very low estrogenic activity, and also indicate that estrone does not diminish the estrogenic activity of estradiol. This contradicts some cell-free in-vitro research suggesting that high concentrations of estrone might be able to partially antagonize the actions of estradiol.

Selected biological properties of endogenous estrogens in rats
Estrogen	ER RBA (%)	Uterine weight (%)	Uterotrophy	LH levels (%)	SHBG RBA (%)
Control	–	100	–	100	–
Estradiol (E2)	100	506 ± 20	+++	12–19	100
Estrone (E1)	11 ± 8	490 ± 22	+++	?	20
Estriol (E3)	10 ± 4	468 ± 30	+++	8–18	3
Estetrol (E4)	0.5 ± 0.2	?	Inactive	?	1
17α-Estradiol	4.2 ± 0.8	?	?	?	?
2-Hydroxyestradiol	24 ± 7	285 ± 8	+^{b}	31–61	28
2-Methoxyestradiol	0.05 ± 0.04	101	Inactive	?	130
4-Hydroxyestradiol	45 ± 12	?	?	?	?
4-Methoxyestradiol	1.3 ± 0.2	260	++	?	9
4-Fluoroestradiol^{a}	180 ± 43	?	+++	?	?
2-Hydroxyestrone	1.9 ± 0.8	130 ± 9	Inactive	110–142	8
2-Methoxyestrone	0.01 ± 0.00	103 ± 7	Inactive	95–100	120
4-Hydroxyestrone	11 ± 4	351	++	21–50	35
4-Methoxyestrone	0.13 ± 0.04	338	++	65–92	12
16α-Hydroxyestrone	2.8 ± 1.0	552 ± 42	+++	7–24	<0.5
2-Hydroxyestriol	0.9 ± 0.3	302	+^{b}	?	?
2-Methoxyestriol	0.01 ± 0.00	?	Inactive	?	4
Notes: Values are mean ± SD or range. ER RBA = Relative binding affinity to estrogen receptors of rat uterine cytosol. Uterine weight = Percentage change in uterine wet weight of ovariectomized rats after 72 hours with continuous administration of 1 μg/hour via subcutaneously implanted osmotic pumps. LH levels = Luteinizing hormone levels relative to baseline of ovariectomized rats after 24 to 72 hours of continuous administration via subcutaneous implant. Footnotes: ^{a} = Synthetic (i.e., not endogenous). ^{b} = Atypical uterotrophic effect which plateaus within 48 hours (estradiol's uterotrophy continues linearly up to 72 hours). Sources:

== Biochemistry ==
Comprehensive overview of steroidogenesis, showing estrone on the lower right among the estrogens.

=== Biosynthesis ===
Estrone is biosynthesized from cholesterol. The principal pathway involves androstenedione as an intermediate, with androstenedione being transformed into estrone by the enzyme aromatase. This reaction occurs in both the gonads and in certain other tissues, particularly adipose tissue, and estrone is subsequently secreted from these tissues. In addition to aromatization of androstenedione, estrone is also formed reversibly from estradiol by the enzyme 17β-hydroxysteroid dehydrogenase (17β-HSD) in various tissues, including the liver, uterus, and mammary gland.

Mechanism of Action:

The way estrone works is by entering the cells of certain tissues in the body and attaching to nuclear receptors. This interaction then influences how genes are expressed, leading to various physiological responses in the body.

=== Distribution ===
Estrone is bound approximately 16% to sex hormone-binding globulin (SHBG) and 80% to albumin in the circulation, with the remainder (2.0 to 4.0%) circulating freely or unbound. It has about 24% of the relative binding affinity of estradiol for SHBG. As such, estrone is relatively poorly bound to SHBG.

=== Metabolism ===
Estrone is conjugated into estrogen conjugates such as estrone sulfate and estrone glucuronide by sulfotransferases and glucuronidases, and can also be hydroxylated by cytochrome P450 enzymes into catechol estrogens such as 2-hydroxyestrone and 4-hydroxyestrone or into estriol. Both of these transformations take place predominantly in the liver. Estrone can also be reversibly converted into estradiol by 17β-HSD. The blood half-life of estrone is about 10 to 70 minutes and is similar to that of estradiol.

Metabolic pathways of estradiol in humans

Description: The metabolic pathways involved in the metabolism of estradiol and other natural estrogens (e.g., estrone, estriol) in humans. In addition to the metabolic transformations shown in the diagram, conjugation (e.g., sulfation and glucuronidation) occurs in the case of estradiol and metabolites of estradiol that have one or more available hydroxyl (–OH) groups. Sources: See template page.

=== Excretion ===
Estrone is excreted in urine in the form of estrogen conjugates such as estrone sulfate. Following an intravenous injection of labeled estrone in women, almost 90% is excreted in urine and feces within 4 to 5 days. Enterohepatic recirculation causes a delay in excretion of estrone.

It is one of the three primary types of estrogen and is produced in various parts of the body, including the placenta, ovaries, and peripheral tissues.

=== Levels ===
Production rates, secretion rates, clearance rates, and blood levels of major sex hormones
Sex	Sex hormone	Reproductive phase	Blood production rate	Gonadal secretion rate	Metabolic clearance rate	Reference range (serum levels)	
Sex	Sex hormone	Reproductive phase	Blood production rate	Gonadal secretion rate	Metabolic clearance rate	Molar concentration	Mass concentration
Men	Androstenedione	–	2.8 mg/day	1.6 mg/day	2200 L/day	2.8–7.3 nmol/L	80–210 ng/dL
Men	Testosterone	–	6.5 mg/day	6.2 mg/day	950 L/day	6.9–34.7 nmol/L	200–1000 ng/dL
Men	Estrone	–	150 μg/day	110 μg/day	2050 L/day	37–250 pmol/L	10–70 pg/mL
Men	Estradiol	–	60 μg/day	50 μg/day	1600 L/day	<37–210 pmol/L	10–57 pg/mL
Men	Estrone sulfate	–	80 μg/day	Insignificant	167 L/day	600–2500 pmol/L	200–900 pg/mL
Women	Androstenedione	–	3.2 mg/day	2.8 mg/day	2000 L/day	3.1–12.2 nmol/L	89–350 ng/dL
Women	Testosterone	–	190 μg/day	60 μg/day	500 L/day	0.7–2.8 nmol/L	20–81 ng/dL
Women	Estrone	Follicular phase	110 μg/day	80 μg/day	2200 L/day	110–400 pmol/L	30–110 pg/mL
Women	Estrone	Luteal phase	260 μg/day	150 μg/day	2200 L/day	310–660 pmol/L	80–180 pg/mL
Women	Estrone	Postmenopause	40 μg/day	Insignificant	1610 L/day	22–230 pmol/L	6–60 pg/mL
Women	Estradiol	Follicular phase	90 μg/day	80 μg/day	1200 L/day	<37–360 pmol/L	10–98 pg/mL
Women	Estradiol	Luteal phase	250 μg/day	240 μg/day	1200 L/day	699–1250 pmol/L	190–341 pg/mL
Women	Estradiol	Postmenopause	6 μg/day	Insignificant	910 L/day	<37–140 pmol/L	10–38 pg/mL
Women	Estrone sulfate	Follicular phase	100 μg/day	Insignificant	146 L/day	700–3600 pmol/L	250–1300 pg/mL
Women	Estrone sulfate	Luteal phase	180 μg/day	Insignificant	146 L/day	1100–7300 pmol/L	400–2600 pg/mL
Women	Progesterone	Follicular phase	2 mg/day	1.7 mg/day	2100 L/day	0.3–3 nmol/L	0.1–0.9 ng/mL
Women	Progesterone	Luteal phase	25 mg/day	24 mg/day	2100 L/day	19–45 nmol/L	6–14 ng/mL
Notes and sources Notes: "The concentration of a steroid in the circulation is determined by the rate at which it is secreted from glands, the rate of metabolism of precursor or prehormones into the steroid, and the rate at which it is extracted by tissues and metabolized. The secretion rate of a steroid refers to the total secretion of the compound from a gland per unit time. Secretion rates have been assessed by sampling the venous effluent from a gland over time and subtracting out the arterial and peripheral venous hormone concentration. The metabolic clearance rate of a steroid is defined as the volume of blood that has been completely cleared of the hormone per unit time. The production rate of a steroid hormone refers to entry into the blood of the compound from all possible sources, including secretion from glands and conversion of prohormones into the steroid of interest. At steady state, the amount of hormone entering the blood from all sources will be equal to the rate at which it is being cleared (metabolic clearance rate) multiplied by blood concentration (production rate = metabolic clearance rate × concentration). If there is little contribution of prohormone metabolism to the circulating pool of steroid, then the production rate will approximate the secretion rate." Sources: See template.

Toxicity:

When estrone is used too much or taken in large amounts, it can cause toxicity, leading to symptoms like nausea and vomiting. Estrone should be stored in its original package or container to maintain its quality and effectiveness.

== Chemistry ==
Structures of major endogenous estrogens
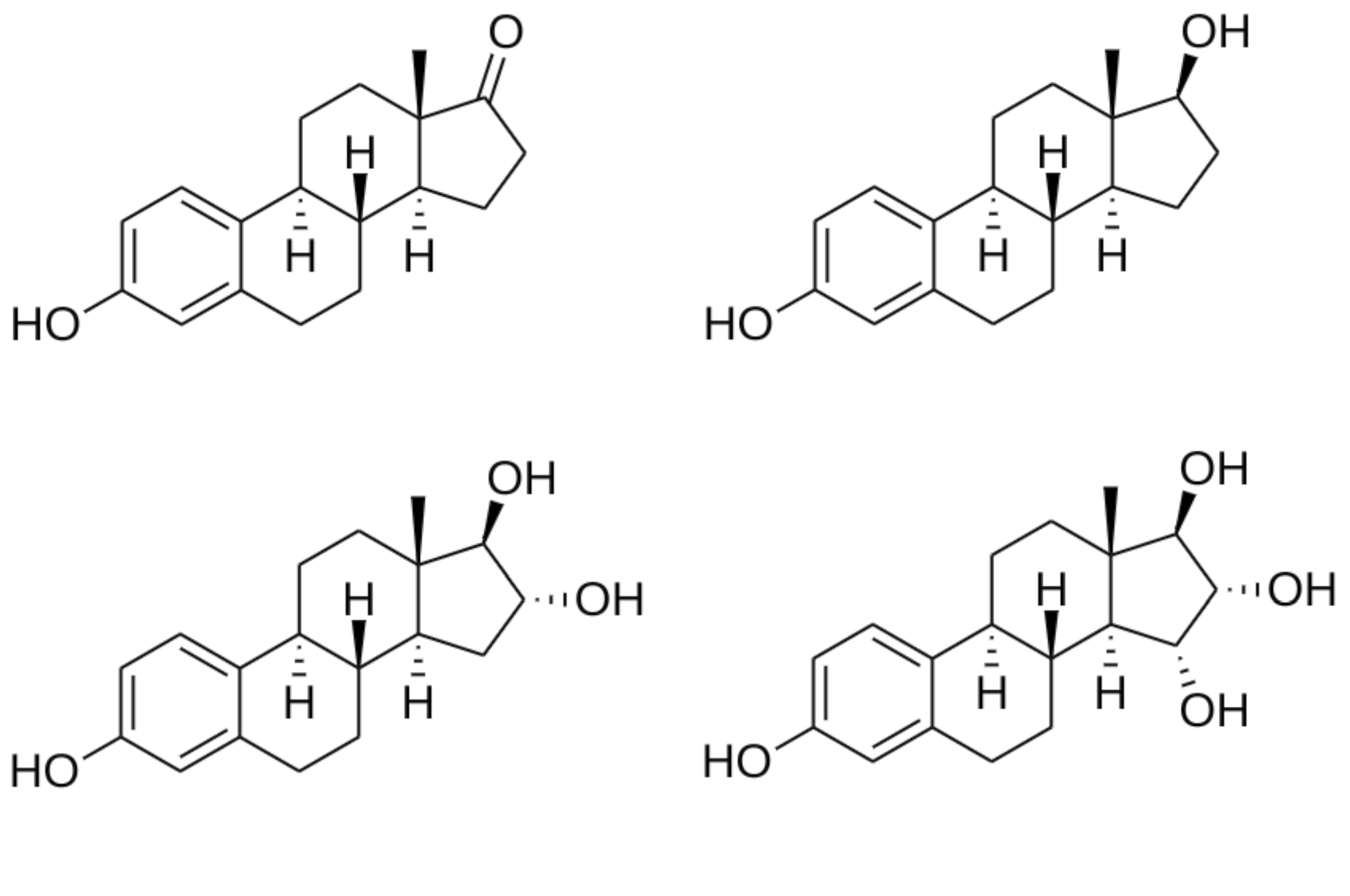
Note the hydroxyl (–OH) groups: estrone (E1) has one, estradiol (E2) has two, estriol (E3) has three, and estetrol (E4) has four.

Estrone, also known as estra-1,3,5(10)-trien-3-ol-17-one, is a naturally occurring estrane steroid with double bonds at the C1, C3, and C5 positions, a hydroxyl group at the C3 position, and a ketone group at the C17 position. The name estrone was derived from the chemical terms estrin (estra-1,3,5(10)-triene) and ketone.

The chemical formula of estrone is C_{18}H_{22}O_{2} and its molecular weight is 270.366 g/mol. It is a white, odorless, solid crystalline powder, with a melting point of 254.5 °C (490 °F) and a specific gravity of 1.23. Estrone is combustible at high temperatures, with the products carbon monoxide (CO) and carbon dioxide (CO_{2}).

== Medical use ==
Estrone has been available as an injected estrogen for medical use, for instance in hormone therapy for menopausal symptoms, but it is now mostly no longer marketed.

Estrone, as part of hormone replacement therapy (HRT), is frequently used to treat symptoms caused by estrogen deficiency in peri and post-menopausal women. This therapy aims to enhance overall health and relieve menopausal symptoms related to estrogen imbalance. Additionally, estrone and other estrogens are used to prevent osteoporosis in postmenopausal women who are at high risk of fractures and cannot tolerate alternative medications. Estrogens are absorbed efficiently by the body and subsequently inactivated in the liver, making them effective in HRT and osteoporosis prevention.

== Contraindications ==
The use of estrone has several contraindications, some examples including: hypersensitivity, history of some cancers, stroke, venous thromboembolism (VTE), and those currently pregnant or breastfeeding. Estrogens hold a boxed warning to be used at the lowest effective dose and for the shortest possible treatment period if used alone or with another hormone in the progestogen class.

=== Breast Cancer ===
Estrone is contraindicated for those that have or are suspected of having breast cancer. The use of estrogens hold a boxed warning with breast cancer for post-menopausal women as this can increase the risk of developing invasive breast cancer. Those with breast cancer become at a greater risk of hypercalcemia and bone metastases when taking estrogens. Post-menopausal women with breast cancer can be seen to develop frailty syndrome when there are changes in blood hormonal levels, including an increased level of estrone. Estrone, the major type of estrogen produced in post-menopausal women, was seen in greater concentrations from standard levels in those that were categorized as prefrail and in those that classified as frail.

=== Venous Thromboembolism ===
The risk of VTE is increased in those that use estrogens, those that currently have or have a history with VTE are at a greater risk of reoccurring VTE with the usage of estrogens. The use of estrogens within three weeks postpartum may increase the risk of developing a VTE. Risk of developing initial VTE is also increased with familial history, genetic mutations: factor V Leiden and prothrombin-G20210A, and pregnancy-postpartum with the use of estrogens.

=== Breastfeeding ===
The use of estrogens may affect the ability to breastfeed and can change the composition of breastmilk. Estrogens have been used to suppress lactation which can result in a reduced total duration of lactation and reduced volume or inability to produce breastmilk. Composition of breastmilk produced was also seen to be different resulting in a reduced concentration of proteins in the milk. Babies of mothers that were taking estrogens while breastfeeding were seen to experience slower weight gain.

== Side effects ==
=== Common ===
Some common side effects seen with the usage of estrogens include: breast swelling, breast tenderness, vaginal itching, abnormal uterine bleeding, weight gain, hair loss, jaundice, and anaphylaxis.

=== Adverse effect ===
Some adverse effects seen with the usage of estrogens include: increased risk of venous thromboembolism (VTE), stroke, breast cancer, hypertension, and vaginitis.

== History ==
Estrone was the first steroid hormone to be discovered. It was discovered in 1929 independently by the American scientists Edward Doisy and Edgar Allen and the German biochemist Adolf Butenandt, although Doisy and Allen isolated it two months before Butenandt. They isolated and purified estrone in crystalline form from the urine of pregnant women. Doisy and Allen named it theelin, while Butenandt named it progynon and subsequently referred to it as folliculin in his second publication on the substance. Butenandt was later awarded the Nobel Prize in 1939 for the isolation of estrone and his work on sex hormones in general. The molecular formula of estrone was known by 1931, and its chemical structure had been determined by Butenandt by 1932. Following the elucidation of its structure, estrone was additionally referred to as ketohydroxyestrin or oxohydroxyestrin, and the name estrone, on the basis of its C17 ketone group, was formally established in 1932 at the first meeting of the International Conference on the Standardization of Sex Hormones in London.

A partial synthesis of estrone from ergosterol was accomplished by Russell Earl Marker in 1936, and was the first chemical synthesis of estrone. An alternative partial synthesis of estrone from cholesterol by way of dehydroepiandrosterone (DHEA) was developed by Hans Herloff Inhoffen and Walter Hohlweg in 1939 or 1940, and a total synthesis of estrone was achieved by Anner and Miescher in 1948.

Approval

The FDA has approved estrone based on its safety and effectiveness as per the rules outlined in sections 505 of the Federal Food, Drug, and Cosmetic Act.
