= Biotransformation =

Chemical alteration of an exogenous substance by or in a biological system

Biotransformation is the biochemical modification of one chemical compound or a mixture of chemical compounds. Biotransformations can be conducted with whole cells, their lysates, or purified enzymes. Increasingly, biotransformations are effected with purified enzymes. Major industries and life-saving technologies depend on biotransformations.

== Advantages and disadvantages ==
Compared to the conventional production of chemicals, biotransformations are often attractive because their selectivities can be high, limiting the coproduction of undesirable coproducts. Generally operating under mild temperatures and pressures in aqueous solutions, many biotransformations are "green". The catalysts, i.e. the enzymes, are amenable to improvement by genetic manipulation.

Biotechnology usually is restrained by substrate scope. Petrochemicals for example are often not amenable to biotransformations, especially on the scale required for some applications, e.g. fuels. Biotransformations can be slow and are often incompatible with high temperatures, which are employed in traditional chemical synthesis to increase rates. Enzymes are generally only stable <100 °C, and usually much lower. Enzymes, like other catalysts are poisonable. In some cases, performance or recyclability can be improved by using immobilized enzymes.

== Historical ==
Wine and beer making are examples of biotransformations that have been practiced since ancient times. Vinegar has long been produced by fermentation, involving the oxidation of ethanol to acetic acid. Cheesemaking traditionally relies on microbes to convert dairy precursors. Yogurt is produced by inoculating heat-treated milk with microorganisms such as Streptococcus thermophilus and Lactobacillus bulgaricus.

== Modern examples ==
=== Pharmaceuticals ===
Beta-lactam antibiotics, e.g., penicillin and cephalosporin are produced by biotransformations in an industry valued several billions of dollars. Processes are conducted in vessels up to 60,000 gal in volume. Sugars, methionine, and ammonium salts are used as C,S,N sources. Genetically modified Penicillium chrysogenum is employed for penicillin production.

Some steroids are hydroxylated in vitro to give drugs.

=== Sugars ===
High fructose corn syrup is generated by biotransformation of corn starch, which is converted to a mixture of glucose and fructose. Glucoamylase is one enzyme used in the process.

Cyclodextrins are produced by transferases.

=== Amino acids ===
Amino acids are sometimes produced industrially by transaminases. In other cases, amino acids are obtained by biotransformations of peptides using peptidases.

=== Acrylamide ===
With acrylonitrile and water as substrates, nitrile hydratase enzymes are used to produce acrylamide, a valued monomer.

=== Biofuels ===
Many kinds of fuels and lubricants are produced by processes that include biotransformations starting from natural precursors such as fats, cellulose, and sugars.

== See also ==
- Biotechnology
- Biodegradation
