= Steroid ester =

Class of chemical compounds

Estradiol valerate, an ester of estradiol and one of the most widely used estrogen esters. It has increased oral bioavailability and a longer duration with intramuscular injection relative to estradiol.

A steroid ester is an ester of a steroid. They include androgen esters, estrogen esters, progestogen esters, and corticosteroid esters. Steroid esters may be naturally occurring/endogenous like DHEA sulfate or synthetic like estradiol valerate. Esterification is useful because it is often able to render the parent steroid into a prodrug of itself with altered chemical properties such as improved metabolic stability, water solubility, and/or lipophilicity. This, in turn, can enhance pharmacokinetics, for instance by improving the steroid's bioavailability and/or conferring depot activity and hence an extended duration with intramuscular or subcutaneous injection.

Esterification of steroids with fatty acids was developed to prolong the duration of effect of steroid hormones. By 1957, more than 500 steroid esters had been synthesized, most frequently of androgens. The longer the fatty acid chain, up to a certain optimal length, the longer the duration when prepared as an oil solution and injected. Across a chain length range of 6 to 12 carbon atoms, a length of 9 or 10 carbon atoms (nonanoate or decanoate ester) was found to be optimal in rodents in the case of testosterone esters. Fatty acid esters increase the lipophilicity of steroids, with longer fatty acids resulting in greater lipophilicity. The greater solubility in oil allows the steroid esters to be dissolved in a smaller oil volume, thereby allowing for larger doses with intramuscular injection. In addition, the greater the lipophilicity of the steroid, as measured by the octanol/water partition coefficient (logP), the slower its release from the oily depot at the injection site and the longer its duration.

Steroid esters can also be prepared as crystalline aqueous suspensions. Aqueous suspensions of steroid crystals result in prolongation of duration with intramuscular injection similarly to oil solutions. The duration is longer than that of oil solutions, intermediate between oil solutions and subcutaneous pellet implants. The sizes of crystals in suspensions varies and can range from 0.1 μm to some hundreds of μm. The duration of crystalline steroid suspensions increases directly with the size of the crystals. However, crystalline suspensions have an irritating effect in the body, and intramuscular injections of crystalline steroid suspensions result in painful local reactions. These reactions worsen with larger crystals, and for this reason, crystal sizes must be limited to minimize local reactions. Particle sizes of more than 300 μg in the case of estradiol benzoate by intramuscular injection have been found to be too painful for use.

In some cases, crystalline steroid suspensions are used not for prolongation of effect, but because the solubility of the steroid result in this preparation being the only practical way to deliver the steroid in a reasonable injection volume. Examples include cortisone acetate and hydrocortisone and its esters. A requirement of long-lasting crystalline steroid administration is that the steroid be sufficiently water-insoluble, so that it dissolves slowly and thereby attains a prolonged therapeutic effect. The crystals in suspensions can sometimes clump together or aggregate and grow in size. This can be avoided by careful formulation. Crystalline suspensions of steroids are prepared either by precipitation or by dispersing finely divided material in an aqueous suspension medium. Desired particle size can be achieved by grinding, for instance through the use of an atomizer.

Adolf Butenandt reported in 1932 that estrone benzoate in oil solution had a prolonged duration with injection in animals. No such prolongation of action occurred if it was given by intravenous injection. Estradiol benzoate was synthesized in 1933 and was marketed for use the same year.

== Sulfur-based esters ==
Certain sulfur-based steroid esters have a sulfamate or sulfonamide moiety as the ester, typically at the C3 and/or C17β positions. Like many other steroid esters, they are prodrugs. Unlike other steroid esters however, they bypass first-pass metabolism with oral administration and have high oral bioavailability and potency, abolished first-pass hepatic impact, and long elimination half-lives and durations of action. They are under development for potential clinical use. Examples include the estradiol esters estradiol sulfamate (E2MATE; also a potent steroid sulfatase inhibitor) and EC508 (estradiol 17β-(1-(4-(aminosulfonyl)benzoyl)-L-proline)), the testosterone ester EC586 (testosterone 17β-(1-((5-(aminosulfonyl)-2-pyridinyl)carbonyl)-L-proline)), and sulfonamide esters of levonorgestrel and etonogestrel.

== See also ==
- List of steroid esters
- Steroid sulfate
