= Barry V. L. Potter =

British biochemist

Barry V L Potter DSc MAE FMedSci
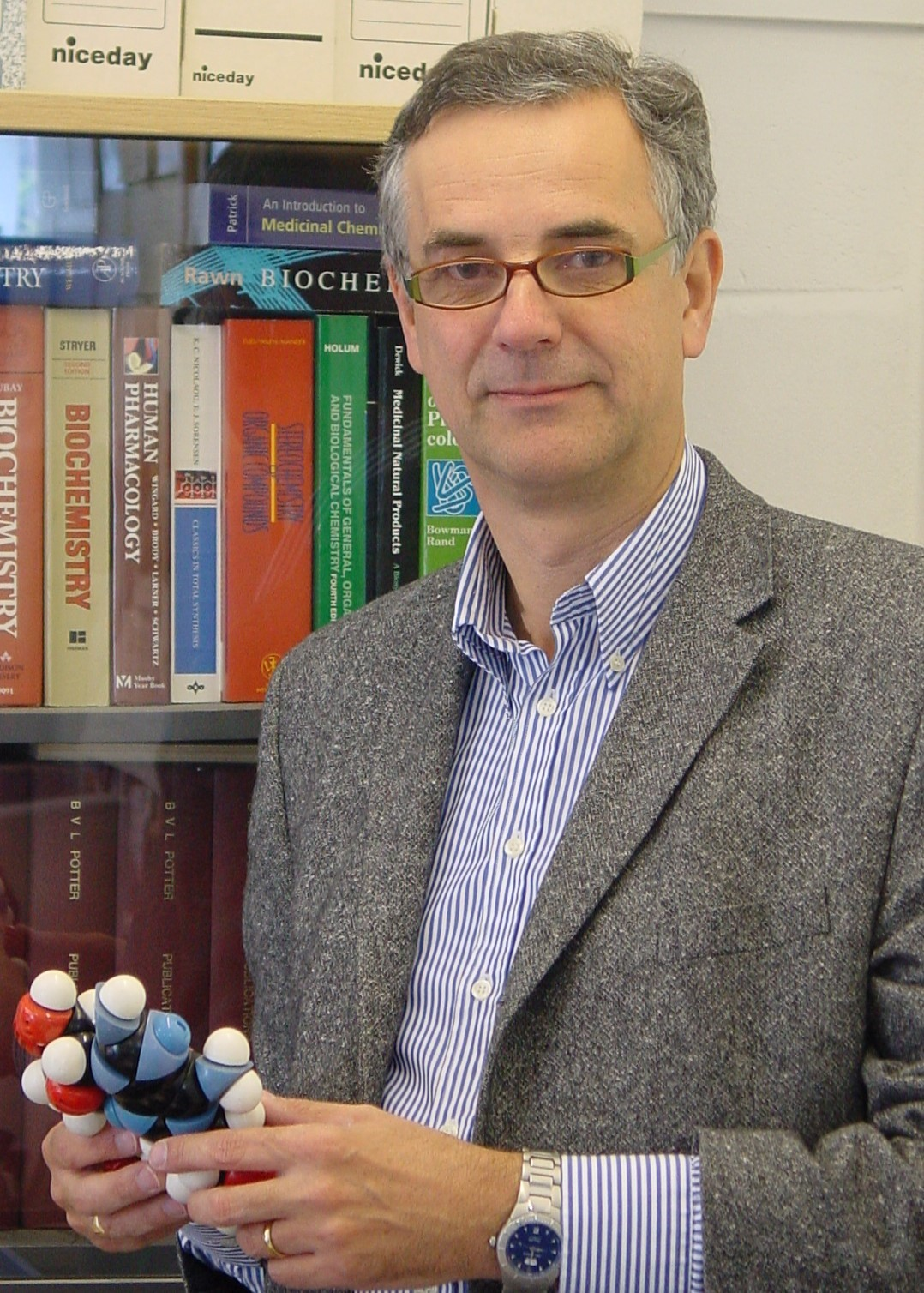
- Barry Potter at the University of Bath, UK
- Born: Brighton, Sussex, UK
- Awards: RSC Medal for Chemical Biology (2007); RSC George and Christine Sosnovsky Medal in Cancer Therapy (2007/8); GlaxoSmithKline International Achievement Award (2009); RSC Malcolm Campbell Memorial Medal (2009); RSC 2010 Interdisciplinary Medal (2010); European Life Science Award (2012); RSC-BMCS Lectureship (2015/16); Tu Youyou Award for Natural Product and Medicinal Chemistry (2018); Fellow of the Royal Society of Chemistry (1990); Fellow of the Royal Society of Biology (2008); Member Academia Europaea (2009); Fellow of the Academy of Medical Sciences (2008); DSc honoris causa, University of Bath (2022) Honorary Fellow of the British Pharmacological Society (2022)

Academic background
- Education: Hove County Grammar School
- Alma mater: University of Oxford MA, DPhil, DSc; Worcester College; Wolfson College; University College
- Thesis: An Investigation of Enzyme Mechanisms using Substrate Analogues
- Doctoral advisor: Gordon Lowe FRS

Academic work
- Institutions: University of Oxford; Max-Planck-Institut für experimentelle Medizin, Göttingen; University of Leicester; University of Bath; University of Oxford
- Notable works: Stereochemistry of Phosphoryl Transfer Chemistry of Signal Transduction Drug Design & Discovery, Irosustat, E2MATE, Steroid Sulfatase
- Website: pharm.ox.ac.uk/team/barry-v-l-potter

Barry Victor Lloyd Potter (born 1953) MAE FMedSci is a British chemist, who is Professor of Medicinal & Biological Chemistry in the Department of Pharmacology at the University of Oxford, Wellcome Trust Senior Investigator and a Fellow of University College, Oxford.

== Early life and education ==
Potter was born in Brighton, Sussex and attended Hove County Grammar School. He won an Open Exhibition scholarship to Worcester College, University of Oxford to study Chemistry and obtained a first class Bachelor of Arts degree (with a subsequent MA), also winning the Part II Thesis Prize in Organic Chemistry. He earned a Doctor of Philosophy degree from Wolfson College, Oxford, where he also won a Graduate Scholarship and was later Junior Research Fellow, for work carried out in the Dyson Perrins Laboratory on the stereochemistry of enzyme-catalyzed phosphoryl transfer reactions under the supervision of Gordon Lowe FRS. He was subsequently awarded a DSc degree from the University of Oxford for his published work up to 1992 in Studies in Biological Chemistry.

== Career and research ==
Potter was a postdoctoral research associate first at Oxford and subsequently was funded by the Royal Society to work at the Max Planck Institute for Experimental Medicine (now Max Planck Institute for Multidisciplinary Sciences) in Göttingen, Federal Republic of Germany with Professor Fritz Eckstein in the nucleic acid and molecular biology fields and he later became a Wissenschaftlicher Mitarbeiter. He was lecturer in biological chemistry in the Department of Chemistry at the University of Leicester, a Lister Institute of Preventive Medicine Research Fellow and held the established chair of Medicinal Chemistry at University of Bath for over 20 years, initially as Lister Institute Research Professor, and is currently a visiting professor. He was visiting professor of medicinal and biological chemistry at the University of Oxford until 2015. His research, primarily employing synthetic organic chemistry, is highly interdisciplinary at the interfaces of Chemistry with Biology and with Medicine and encompasses medicinal and biological chemistry, chemical biology and drug design, discovery and development, especially for oncology and women's health.

He is particularly known for his enzyme mechanistic work on the stereochemistry of enzyme reactions that transfer phosphate groups eg kinases, phosphatases, polymerases, nucleases etc, pioneering application of synthetic chiral isotopomeric phosphates using both stable isotopes of ^{16}O-oxygen in the [^{16}O,^{17}O,^{18}O] - approach, also using the ^{18}O-isotope in combination with sulphur in the [^{16}O,^{18}O, S] - approach and the [^{16}O,^{18}O] - approach for internucleotidic linkages; and the application of synthetic and biological chemistry techniques to cellular signalling through the study of the calcium-releasing second messengers inositol trisphosphate (IP_{3}), cyclic adenosine 5'-diphosphate ribose (cADPR), nicotinic acid adenine diphosphate ribose 2'-phosphate (NAADP) and adenosine 5'-diphosphate ribose (ADPR) and also more widely in nucleotide and carbohydrate chemistry.

In his drug design and discovery work one of the academically discovered "first-in-class" clinical drug targets identified was steroid sulfatase (STS) and the first potent inhibitor was designed and synthesized by the Potter research group as the steroidal sulfamate EMATE. Such synthetic active-site-directed, irreversible, time-dependent steroidal and non-steroidal inactivators of the enzyme progressed to clinical trials and were translated to the pharmaceutical industry. This work in collaboration with Michael J Reed lead to sulfamate-based drugs such as Irosustat (BN83495, STX64) and E2MATE (PGL2001) that have completed many clinical trials in the UK, Europe, USA and Australia in women's health, including for hormone replacement therapy and endometriosis, post-menopausal ER+ hormone dependent breast cancer, advanced/metastatic or recurrent estrogen receptor-positive endometrial cancer and castration-resistant prostate cancer and Irosustat was also evaluated as a combination therapy with an oral epidermal growth factor receptor tyrosine kinase inhibitor for the Treatment of Non-Small Cell Lung Cancer Patients. Irosustat is still progressing clinically. E2MATE/PGL2001 was well tolerated and for endometriosis first clinical trials showed that local endometrial STS could be reduced by 91% by a single dose of only 4 mg/per week of the drug alone and 96% in combination with a progestin. A Phase II, multicentre, randomised, two-arm, parallel group, double-blind, placebo controlled, clinical study was initiated at 20 clinical centres in Hungary, Romania and Poland. Results are awaited. In randomised phase II trials using Irosustat vs the current standard of care (megestrol acetate) in recurrent/metastatic post-menopausal endometrial cancer patients results showed clinical activity and a good safety profile. Pharmacodynamic proof of concept for Irosustat was demonstrated in prostate cancer patients with suppression of the non-sulfated androgens testosterone, androstenediol and DHEA. The most recent IRIS and IPET breast cancer clinical trials met their clinical endpoints; results were discussed and clinical benefit demonstrated for Irosustat both as a monotherapy in early breast cancer and in combination with an aromatase inhibitor. Further trials are necessary.

Potter co-founded in 1997 the university spin-out company Sterix Limited jointly between the University of Bath and Imperial College, London and was Director of Medicinal Chemistry and Chief Scientific Officer. Sterix Ltd pioneered inter alia the first human clinical trials of a steroid sulfatase inhibitor in breast cancer patients and was acquired by the French Ipsen Group in 2004.

It has been demonstrated that oral treatment with the STS inhibitor Irosustat alleviates the symptoms of Alzheimer's disease in a murine model, indicating that the drug passes the blood–brain barrier. STS inhibitors could therefore potentially be employed to treat such ageing and ageing-associated diseases, including Huntington’s and Parkinson’s diseases. The Spanish spin-out company ONESTX will pursue clinical application to such pathologies with STX64/Irosustat, both alone and in combination with neurosteroids.

Because of dual effects on stimulation of bone formation and inhibition of bone resorption Nexyon Biotech (Korea) is taking sulfatase inhibition into phase 2 clinical trials for osteogenesis imperfecta

In 2020-2021 a themed journal issue was dedicated to Professor Potter entitled: "From Cell Signalling to Anticancer Drug Discovery".

As of 2025, Potter has published more than 550 articles in peer-reviewed journals, with many of his papers appearing in highly selective journals and is inventor of 45 granted US patents. His work has been cited ca. 25,000 times and he has an h-index of 78 and an i10 index of 440.

== Awards and honours ==
Potter is a Fellow of the Royal Society of Chemistry (FRSC) and Fellow of the Royal Society of Biology (FRSB).

He was elected a Fellow of the Academy of Medical Sciences (FMedSci) in 2008. The citation reads:

He has made wide-ranging contributions at the interface of Chemistry with both Biology and Medicine. In Chemical Biology he has elucidated the stereochemistry of numerous enzyme-catalysed phosphoryl and nucleotidyl transfer reactions using isotopically chiral substrates and DNA fragments. He has applied organic synthesis techniques in novel ways using carbohydrate, cyclitol and phosphorus chemistry to design modulators of cellular signal transduction processes that mobilize intracellular Ca^{2+} through second messengers. Of particular relevance to this Academy he has pioneered the novel aryl sulfamate pharmacophore in drug design. Unusually within an academic setting, he has brought compounds from initial academic concept to multiple clinical trials in women's health. These have shown evidence of efficacy in humans, particularly in the anti-cancer field related to hormone-dependent breast cancer.

He was elected a Member (MAE) of the pan-European Academy of Science, Humanities & Letters the Academia Europaea in 2009.

He has also won a number of academic and industrial awards and medals e.g.: Royal Society of Chemistry, 2007 UCB-Celltech Industrially Sponsored Award & Medal for Chemical Biology; Royal Society of Chemistry, 2007/8 George and Christine Sosnovsky Award & Medal in Cancer Therapy; 2009 GlaxoSmithKline International Achievement Award; Royal Society of Chemistry, Biological & Medicinal Chemistry Section, 2009 Malcolm Campbell Memorial Prize & Medal (jointly); Royal Society of Chemistry 2010 Interdisciplinary Prize & Medal; 2012 European Life Science Award, Investigator of the Year; Royal Society of Chemistry, Biological & Medicinal Chemistry Section, 2015/16 2nd RSC-BMCS Lectureship; 2018 Tu Youyou Award for Natural Product and Medicinal Chemistry.

In 2022 Potter was awarded the degree of Doctor of Science honoris causa by the University of Bath and was also elected to an Honorary Fellowship of the British Pharmacological Society (HonFBPhS).
