= Ethinylestradiol sulfonate =

Estrogenic drug

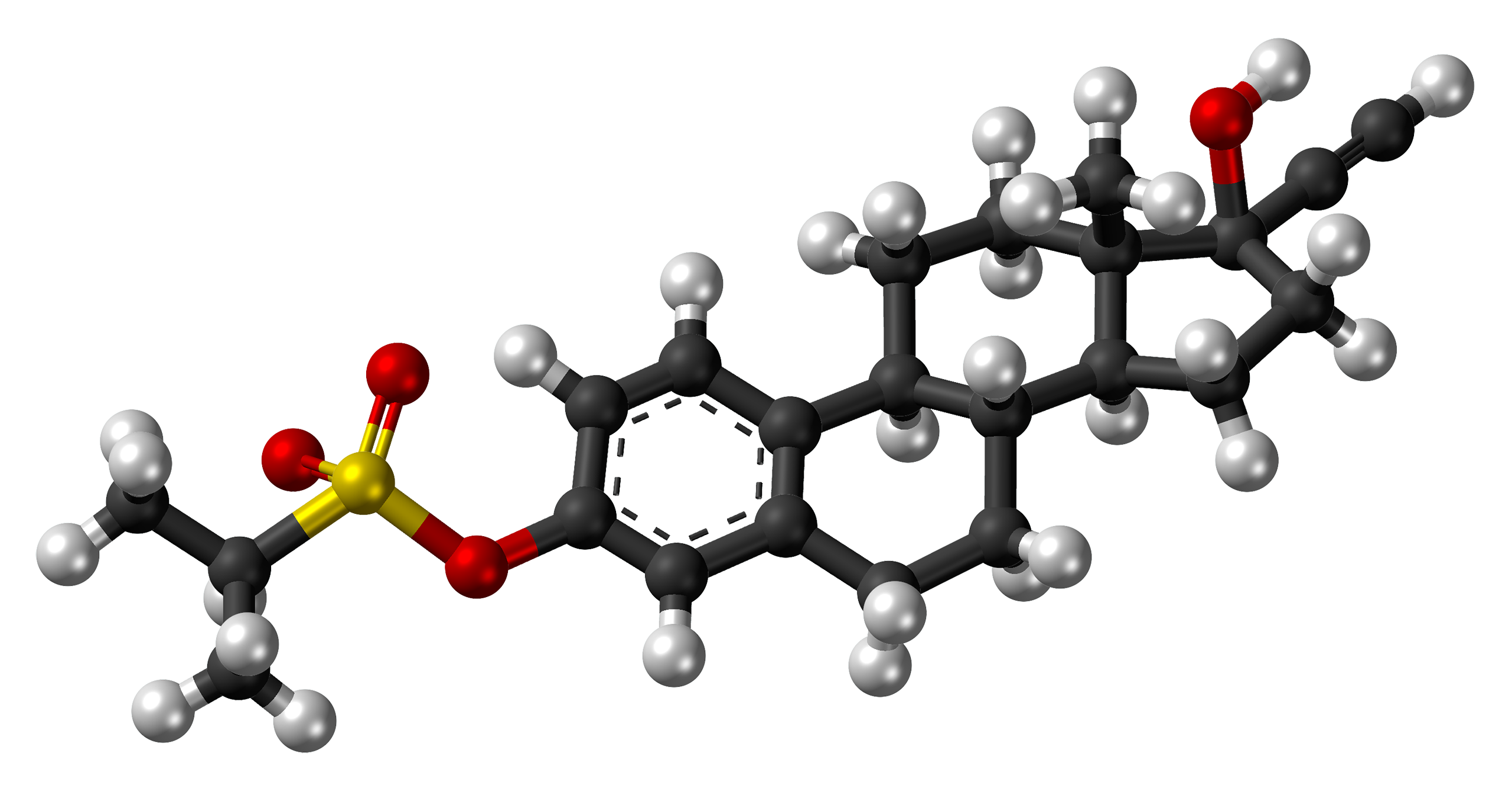

Clinical data
- Trade names: Deposiston, Turisteron
- Other names: EES; Turisteron; J96; Ethinylestradiol 3-isopropylsulfonate; Ethinylestradiol 3-(2-propanesulfonate); 17α-Ethynyl-3-isopropyl-sulfonyloxyestradiol
- Routes of administration: By mouth
- Drug class: Estrogen; Estrogen ester

Pharmacokinetic data
- Metabolites: • Ethinylestradiol
- Elimination half-life: Oral: 6 days

Identifiers
- IUPAC name: [(8R,9S,13S,14S,17R)-17-ethynyl-17-hydroxy-13-methyl-7,8,9,11,12,14,15,16-octahydro-6H-cyclopenta[a]phenanthren-3-yl] propane-2-sulfonate
- CAS Number: 28913-23-7
- PubChem CID: 68582
- ChemSpider: 61851
- UNII: XF48685MYR
- KEGG: D07928
- ChEBI: CHEBI:135643
- CompTox Dashboard (EPA): DTXSID20951545

Chemical and physical data
- Formula: C_{23}H_{30}O_{4}S
- Molar mass: 402.55 g·mol^{−1}
- 3D model (JSmol): Interactive image
- SMILES: CC(C)S(=O)(=O)OC1=CC2=C(C=C1)C3CCC4(C(C3CC2)CCC4(C#C)O)C
- InChI: InChI=1S/C23H30O4S/c1-5-23(24)13-11-21-20-8-6-16-14-17(27-28(25,26)15(2)3)7-9-18(16)19(20)10-12-22(21,23)4/h1,7,9,14-15,19-21,24H,6,8,10-13H2,2-4H3/t19-,20-,21+,22+,23+/m1/s1; Key:KPEUDULLQDHKAZ-VROINQGHSA-N

Ethinylestradiol sulfonate (EES), sold under the brand names Deposiston and Turisteron among others, is an estrogen medication which has been used in birth control pills for women and in the treatment of prostate cancer in men. It has also been investigated in the treatment of breast cancer in women. The medication was combined with norethisterone acetate in birth control pills. EES is taken by mouth once per week.

Side effects of EES in men include breast tenderness, gynecomastia, feminization, sexual dysfunction, and cardiovascular complications, among others. EES is a synthetic estrogen and hence is an agonist of the estrogen receptor, the biological target of estrogens like estradiol. It is an estrogen ester and a long-lasting prodrug of ethinylestradiol in the body. EES is rapidly taken up into fat and slowly released from it, resulting in a biological half-life of about 6 days with the oral route and allowing the medication to be taken only once per week.

EES was first synthesized in 1967, was first introduced as a birth control pill in 1978, and was introduced for the treatment of prostate cancer in 1980. It has been marketed in Germany, but may no longer be available.

== Medical uses ==
EES has been used in combination with norethisterone acetate as a once-a-week birth control pill and by itself as a form of high-dose estrogen therapy in the treatment of prostate cancer. It has also been assessed in the treatment of breast cancer. The medication is used at a dosage of 1 mg once per week in birth control pills and 1 to 2 mg once per week in the treatment of prostate cancer. The 1 week and 2 mg/week dosages of EES are equivalent to daily doses of 0.143 mg and 0.285 mg EES, respectively.

EES has been used in combination with antiandrogens such as flutamide, bicalutamide, and cyproterone acetate as a form of combined androgen blockade and as an alternative to the combination of an antiandrogen and surgical or medical castration in the treatment of prostate cancer.

=== Available forms ===
EES was available alone for the treatment of prostate cancer in men in the form of 1 mg oral tablets and in combination with norethisterone acetate in the form of oral tablets containing 1 mg EES and 5 mg norethisterone acetate for use as a birth control pill for women.

== Side effects ==
Side effects of EES in men include breast tenderness, gynecomastia, feminization, sexual dysfunction, shortness of breath (6.8%), increased prolactin levels, and cardiovascular toxicity. The cardiovascular complications of EES in men with prostate cancer specifically include edema (4.5 to 26%), blood clots like deep vein thrombosis (4.1 to 15%) and pulmonary embolism, heart attack (2.3 to 18%), stroke (2.3 to 3.0%), and coronary artery disease (3.3%).

EES has been described as having good tolerability compared to EE in the treatment of prostate cancer, a property that has been described as "remarkable". The unique C3 sulfonate ester of EES seems to reduce its hepatic estrogenicity, which in turn reduces its adverse effects on liver protein synthesis. In particular, EES is said to have considerably reduced cardiovascular side effects relative to EE when used as a form of high-dose estrogen therapy in the treatment of prostate cancer. This may in part be related to the greatly reduced oral dosing frequency of EES relative to EE, as parenteral EE, which bypasses the first pass through the liver that occurs with oral EE, has been found to have a 5-fold lower impact on liver protein synthesis by weight than oral EE. Conversely however, studies with EE-containing contraceptive vaginal rings and contraceptive patches have shown similar metabolic effects and VTE risk as combined birth control pills containing EE.

== Pharmacology ==
Ethinylestradiol (EE), the active form of EES.

EES is an estrogen ester and long-acting prodrug of ethinylestradiol (EE) which is taken orally. The molecular weight of EES is about 136% of that of EE due to the presence of its C3 isopropylsulfonate ester, and hence EES contains about 74% of the amount of EE of an equal dose of EE. EES is more lipophilic than EE, and this results in a depot effect in which EES is taken up into fat and then slowly released from it. Following its release from fat, EES is hydrolyzed into EE. As a result of this depot effect, EES has a very long elimination half-life of about 6 days. This allows it to be taken once per week. Both EES and the related medication quinestrol have been described as depot oral estrogens.

EES is a powerful antigonadotropin, and is capable of suppressing circulating total testosterone levels in men to concentrations comparable to those seen with castration (less than 1 to 3% of initial values). In addition, EES can strongly increase sex hormone-binding globulin (SHBG) levels, thereby additionally decreasing free testosterone levels. As such, EES is a powerful functional antiandrogen, which makes it useful for treating prostate cancer.

The biological half-life of EES in blood has been reported to be 3 hours.

== Chemistry ==
EES, also known as ethinylestradiol 3-isopropylsulfonate or ethinylestradiol 3-(2-propanesulfonate), is a synthetic estrane steroid and a derivative of estradiol. Specifically, it is the C3 isopropylsulfonate ester of ethinylestradiol (17α-ethynylestradiol). EES is similar to quinestrol (EE 3-cyclopentyl ether), which is a C3 ether of EE and is a long-lasting oral depot estrogen similarly.

Analogues of EES include ethinylestradiol N,N-diethylsulfamate (J271) and ethinylestradiol pyrrolidinosulfamate (J272). These analogues are rapidly taken up by erythrocytes in the blood of the hepatic portal vein during the first pass with oral administration, and have been found to be much stronger oral estrogens than EE or EES. EE and EES themselves do not have affinity for erythrocytes. EES and related C3 sulfur-containing esters of EE led to the development of estrogen sulfamates like estradiol 3-sulfamate (J995), estriol 3-sulfamate (J1034), and estradiol 17β-(1-(4-(aminosulfonyl)benzoyl)-L-proline) (EC508), which are highly potent oral estradiol prodrugs that bind to erythrocytes similarly and are under investigation for potential clinical use.

== History ==
EES was first synthesized in 1967 at Jenapharm. It was first introduced for use in combination with norethisterone acetate under the brand name Deposiston as a once-a-week birth control pill for women in 1978. The medication was subsequently introduced by itself under the brand name Turisteron for the treatment of prostate cancer in men in 1980.

== Society and culture ==
=== Generic names ===
Ethinylestradiol sulfonate is the generic name of the drug, but it is also commonly known by its brand names Deposiston and Turisteron. It does not appear to have an INN or other such designations. EES has also been known by its former developmental code name J96.

=== Brand names ===
EES has been marketed in combination with norethisterone acetate under the brand name Deposiston for use as a birth control pill in women and under the brand name Turisteron for use in prostate cancer in men.

=== Availability ===
EES has been marketed in Germany, though it appears that it may no longer be available.

== See also ==
- Ethinylestradiol sulfonate/norethisterone acetate
