= Torgov =

Torgov is a surname. Notable people with the surname include:

- Igor Torgov (1912-2007), Soviet chemist
- Morley Torgov (born 1927), Canadian novelist, humorist and lawyer
- Sarah Torgov (born c. 1956), Canadian actress

== See also ==
- Torgow
