= 2-Methoxyestradiol disulfamate =

Chemical compound

Clinical data
- Other names: 2-Methoxyestradiol disulfamate; 2-Methoxyestradiol 3,17β-disulfamate; 2-Methoxyestradiol-3,17β-O,O-bis(sulfamate); 3,17β-bis-Sulfamoyloxy-2-methoxyestra-1,3,5(10)-triene

Identifiers
- IUPAC name: [(8R,9S,13S,14S,17S)-2-methoxy-13-methyl-3-sulfamoyloxy-6,7,8,9,11,12,14,15,16,17-decahydrocyclopenta[a]phenanthren-17-yl] sulfamate
- CAS Number: 401600-86-0
- PubChem CID: 9804302
- DrugBank: DB08416
- ChemSpider: 7980062
- UNII: S57SQE6LE5
- ChEMBL: ChEMBL218382
- CompTox Dashboard (EPA): DTXSID501336467

Chemical and physical data
- Formula: C_{19}H_{28}N_{2}O_{7}S_{2}
- Molar mass: 460.56 g·mol^{−1}
- 3D model (JSmol): Interactive image
- SMILES: C[C@]12CC[C@H]3[C@H]([C@@H]1CC[C@@H]2OS(=O)(=O)N)CCC4=CC(=C(C=C34)OC)OS(=O)(=O)N
- InChI: InChI=1S/C19H28N2O7S2/c1-19-8-7-12-13(15(19)5-6-18(19)28-30(21,24)25)4-3-11-9-17(27-29(20,22)23)16(26-2)10-14(11)12/h9-10,12-13,15,18H,3-8H2,1-2H3,(H2,20,22,23)(H2,21,24,25)/t12-,13+,15-,18-,19-/m0/s1; Key:AQSNIXKAKUZPSI-SSTWWWIQSA-N

2-Methoxyestradiol disulfamate (developmental code STX-140; also known as 2-methoxyestradiol 3,17β-O,O-bis(sulfamate)) is a synthetic, oral active anti-cancer medication which was previously under development for potential clinical use. It has improved potency, low metabolism, and good pharmacokinetic properties relative to 2-methoxyestradiol (2-MeO-E2). It is also a potent inhibitor of steroid sulfatase, the enzyme that catalyzes the desulfation of steroids such as estrone sulfate and dehydroepiandrosterone sulfate (DHEA-S).

2-Methoxyestradiol disulfamate exhibits anti-angiogenic activity and induction of cell cycle arrest and apoptosis in human tumor xenografts, with clinical potential for hormone–independent tumors. Some of this activity stems from tubulin binding at the colchicine site and disruption of interphase microtubules. 2-Methoxyestradiol disulfamate is highly active in tumors that are resistant to chemotherapy.

In xenograft models of breast and prostate cancer complete cures were achieved after oral treatment with 2-methoxyestradiol disulfamate and drug-resistant tumors also shrank in size after oral treatment. Conventional treatments for hormone-independent cancers targeting tubulin are associated with side effects, such as neurotoxicity, and can only be given infrequently and intravenously. 2-Methoxyestradiol disulfamate is more effective on the same tumors, blocks metastatic spread without the peripheral neuropathy associated with current clinical anticancer drugs.

== See also ==
- Steroid sulfatase § Inhibitors
