= Ethinylestradiol sulfonate/norethisterone acetate =

Combination drug

Ethinylestradiol sulfonate / norethisterone acetate

- Ethinylestradiol sulfonate (top) and norethisterone acetate (bottom)

Combination of
- Ethinylestradiol sulfonate: Estrogen
- Norethisterone acetate: Progestogen

Clinical data
- Trade names: Deposiston
- Other names: EES/NETA
- Routes of administration: By mouth
- Drug class: Estrogen; Progestogen

Identifiers
- CAS Number: 54958-72-4

Ethinylestradiol sulfonate/norethisterone acetate (EES/NETA), sold under the brand name Deposiston, is a combination medication of ethinylestradiol sulfonate (EES), an estrogen, and norethisterone acetate (NETA), a progestin, which was used as a combined birth control pill for women. It was formulated as oral tablets and contained 1 mg EES and 5 mg NETA per tablet. The medication had a long-lasting depot effect and was taken only once per week, for a total of four tablets per cycle. It was developed and marketed by Jenapharm and was previously available in Germany. EES/NETA was introduced for medical use in 1978.

== See also ==
- List of combined sex-hormonal preparations § Estrogens and progestogens
