= EC508 =

Chemical compound

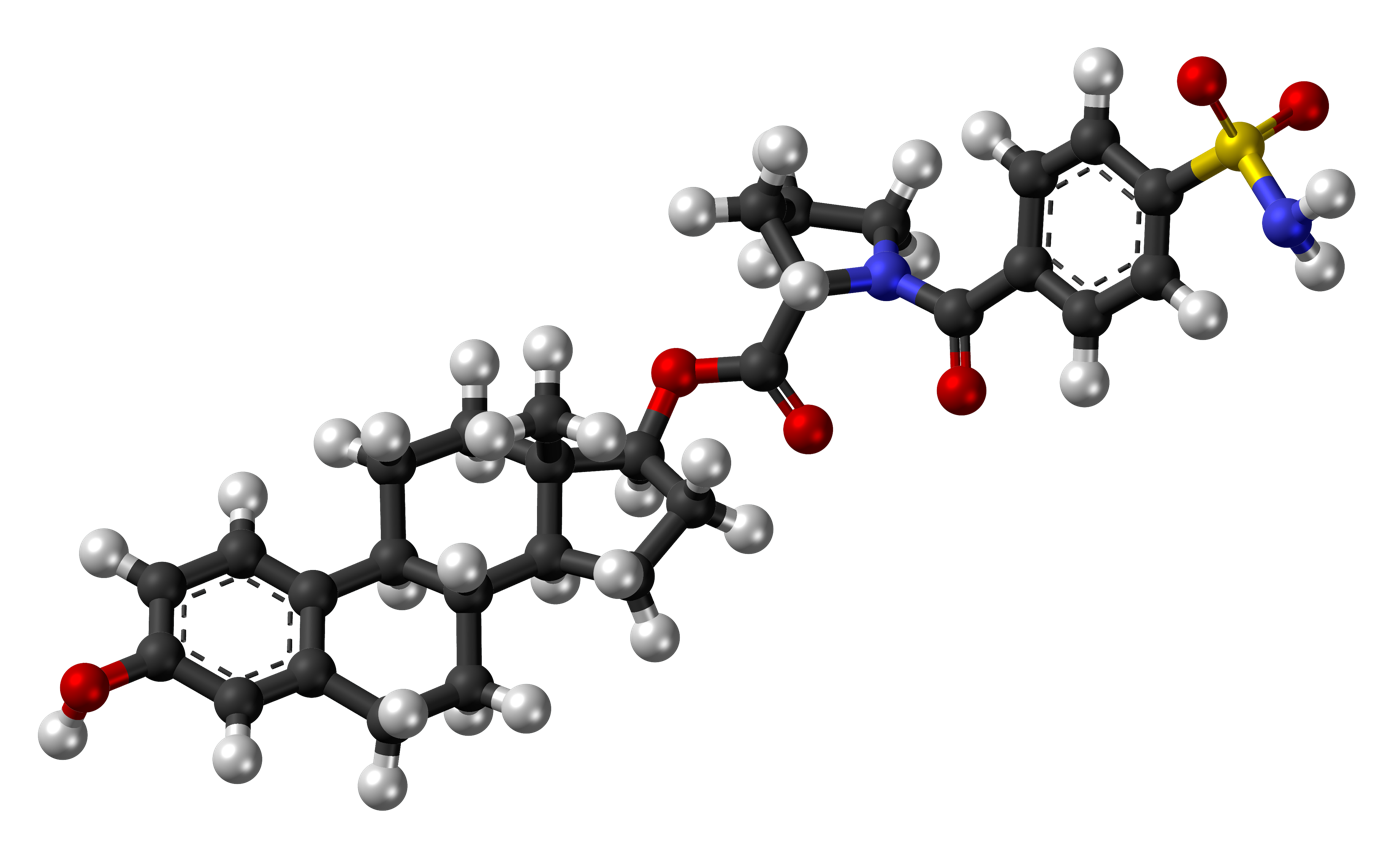

Clinical data
- Other names: EC-508; Estradiol 17β-(1-(4-(aminosulfonyl)benzoyl)-L-proline); Estra-1,3,5(10)-triene-3,17β-diol 17β-(1-[4-(aminosulfonyl)benzoyl]-L-proline); 3-Hydroxyestra-1,3,5(10)-trien-17β-yl 1-[4-(aminosulfonyl)benzoyl]-L-proline
- Drug class: Estrogen; Estrogen ester

Identifiers
- IUPAC name: (8R,9S,13S,14S,17S)-3-hydroxy-13-methyl-7,8,9,11,12,13,14,15,16,17-decahydro-6H-cyclopenta[a]phenanthren-17-yl (4-sulfamoylbenzoyl)-L-prolinate
- CAS Number: 1644459-05-1
- PubChem CID: 117799388
- ChemSpider: 76792889
- UNII: N7ZU267AZB

Chemical and physical data
- Formula: C_{30}H_{36}N_{2}O_{6}S
- Molar mass: 552.69 g·mol^{−1}
- 3D model (JSmol): Interactive image
- SMILES: O=C([C@H]1N(C(C2=CC=C(S(=O)(N)=O)C=C2)=O)CCC1)O[C@H]3CC[C@@]4([H])[C@]5([H])CCC6=CC(O)=CC=C6[C@@]5([H])CC[C@]34C
- InChI: InChI=1S/C30H36N2O6S/c1-30-15-14-23-22-11-7-20(33)17-19(22)6-10-24(23)25(30)12-13-27(30)38-29(35)26-3-2-16-32(26)28(34)18-4-8-21(9-5-18)39(31,36)37/h4-5,7-9,11,17,23-27,33H,2-3,6,10,12-16H2,1H3,(H2,31,36,37)/t23-,24-,25+,26+,27+,30+/m1/s1; Key:DDUJSLXJKGYGCG-OQDYUIEKSA-N

EC508, also known as estradiol 17β-(1-(4-(aminosulfonyl)benzoyl)-L-proline), is an estrogen which is under development by Evestra for use in menopausal hormone therapy and as a hormonal contraceptive for the prevention of pregnancy in women. It is an orally active estrogen ester – specifically, a C17β sulfonamide–proline ester of the natural and bioidentical estrogen estradiol – and acts as a prodrug of estradiol in the body. However, unlike oral estradiol and conventional oral estradiol esters such as estradiol valerate, EC508 undergoes little or no first-pass metabolism, has high oral bioavailability, and does not have disproportionate estrogenic effects in the liver. As such, it has a variety of desirable advantages over oral estradiol, similarly to parenteral estradiol, but with the convenience of oral administration. EC508 is a candidate with the potential to replace not only oral estradiol in clinical practice, but also ethinylestradiol in oral contraceptives. Evestra intends to seek Investigational New Drug status for EC508 in the second quarter of 2018.

== Pharmacokinetics ==
Relative to parenteral routes of estradiol like vaginal, transdermal, and injection, oral estradiol is characterized by low bioavailability and disproportionate effects on liver protein synthesis. Due to extensive metabolism during the first-pass into estrone and estrogen conjugates like estrone sulfate, the oral bioavailability of estradiol and conventional estradiol esters like estradiol valerate is only about 5%, and there is high interindividual variability in estradiol levels achieved. Moreover, because of the first-pass, estradiol levels in the liver are 4 or 5 times higher with oral estradiol than those in the circulation. As a result, oral estradiol has disproportionate estrogenic effects on the hepatic production of lipids, hemostatic factors, growth hormone/insulin-like growth factor 1 axis proteins, angiotensinogen, and other proteins. This is unfavorable and may result in an increased risk of venous thromboembolism, cardiovascular events, and other adverse effects.

The pharmacokinetics of EC508 were assessed in rats; its bioavailability was found to be complete (100%), its clearance in blood was low, and its biological half-life was prolonged at about 5 hours. A single oral dose of 5.0 mg/kg EC508 in rats resulted in peak levels of estradiol of 6,104 ng/mL (6,104,000 pg/mL). EC508 itself showed poor activity as an agonist of the estrogen receptor, with an EC_{50} value of 432 nM relative to 2.3 nM for estradiol (a 188-fold difference), indicating that the estrogenic activity of the compound is solely due to hydrolysis into estradiol. EC508 showed very high oral estrogenic potency, around 100 times that of estradiol and 10 times that of ethinylestradiol in rats. This was determined by uterotrophic effect in ovariectomized rats; an oral dosage of 10 μg/day resulted in uterine weight doubling with EC508, while no effect was observed with estradiol and only a small effect on uterine weight was measured with ethinylestradiol. Conversely, across the dosages assessed, oral estradiol and ethinylestradiol showed marked effects on HDL cholesterol and angiotensinogen levels, while oral EC508 and parenteral estradiol showed no effect at all on these hepatic proteins. These findings are in accordance with the notion that oral EC508, unlike oral estradiol and ethinylestradiol but similarly to parenteral estradiol, bypasses first-pass metabolism and the liver.

The absence of first-pass metabolism and lack of disproportionate liver exposure with EC508 is thought to be due to reversible binding of the sulfonamide moiety of EC508 to an enzyme called carbonic anhydrase II (CAII). EC508 shows moderate affinity for human CAII, with an IC_{50} for binding inhibition of 110 nM. CAII is highly concentrated in erythrocytes (red blood cells), which are present in large quantity in the blood of the hepatic portal vein. It is believed that following its absorption in the intestines and its entrance into the hepatic portal vein, EC508 is taken up by and massively accumulated in erythrocytes, which prevents it from entering the liver and results in it being transported by erythrocytes straight into the circulation. From circulating erythrocytes, EC508 is thought to be slowly released and then hydrolyzed into estradiol. However, one sulfonamide ester of estradiol related to EC508 known as EC518 showed similar properties with very low or absent binding to CAII and hence probably lacking erythrocyte binding, which raises questions about the necessity of CAII binding for such properties and the mechanism by which they occur.

== History ==
Estradiol sulfamate (E2MATE) is a C3 sulfamate ester of estradiol which was developed in the 1990s and was a predecessor of EC508. It binds to CAII, is taken up into and stored within erythrocytes, and shows similar properties to EC508. As a result, E2MATE was under development for potential clinical use as an oral estrogen. However, it showed no increase in estradiol levels and no estrogenic effects in human clinical trials. It appears that there are species differences with E2MATE between rats and primates and that the lack of activity in humans is because E2MATE additionally acts as a highly potent inhibitor of steroid sulfatase. This enzyme is responsible for the hydrolysis of sulfur-based estradiol esters like E2MATE and EC508 into estradiol. By inhibiting steroid sulfatase, E2MATE prevents its own activation into estradiol, which effectively abolishes its estrogenic activity. In addition, it was found that E2MATE was substantially transformed into estrone sulfamate (EMATE) in erythrocytes, which may have further impeded its capacity to be activated into estradiol. In contrast to E2MATE, EC508 is not thought to be a steroid sulfatase inhibitor and cannot be transformed into the corresponding estrone equivalent.

A C17β sulfonamide–proline testosterone ester known as EC586, which has similar properties to those of EC508, is also under development by Evestra, specifically as an androgen and potent oral testosterone prodrug for use in androgen replacement therapy in men. Clinical trials for EC586 and EC508 are undergoing as of 2023.

== See also ==
- List of estrogen esters § Estradiol esters
- List of investigational sex-hormonal agents § Estrogenics
