= Estradiol sulfamate =

Steroid sulfatase inhibitor under development

Clinical data
- Other names: E2MATE; Estradiol-3-O-sulfamate; (E2-SO_{2}-(NH_{2}); J995; ES-J995; PGL-2; PGL-2001; ZK-190628; BLE-00084; 17β-Hydroxyestra-1,3,5(10)-trien-3-yl sulfamate
- Routes of administration: By mouth
- Drug class: Steroid sulfatase inhibitor

Pharmacokinetic data
- Elimination half-life: 18 days

Identifiers
- IUPAC name: [(8R,9S,13S,14S,17S)-17-Hydroxy-13-methyl-6,7,8,9,11,12,14,15,16,17-decahydrocyclopenta[a]phenanthren-3-yl] sulfamate
- CAS Number: 172377-52-5
- PubChem CID: 6918339
- DrugBank: DB06597
- ChemSpider: 5293543
- UNII: WO55ODW08Z
- ChEMBL: ChEMBL219321

Chemical and physical data
- Formula: C_{18}H_{25}NO_{4}S
- Molar mass: 351.46 g·mol^{−1}
- 3D model (JSmol): Interactive image
- SMILES: C[C@]12CC[C@H]3[C@H]([C@@H]1CC[C@@H]2O)CCC4=C3C=CC(=C4)OS(=O)(=O)N
- InChI: InChI=1S/C18H25NO4S/c1-18-9-8-14-13-5-3-12(23-24(19,21)22)10-11(13)2-4-15(14)16(18)6-7-17(18)20/h3,5,10,14-17,20H,2,4,6-9H2,1H3,(H2,19,21,22)/t14-,15-,16+,17+,18+/m1/s1; Key:YXYXCSOJKUAPJI-ZBRFXRBCSA-N

Estradiol sulfamate (E2MATE; developmental code names J995, PGL-2, PGL-2001, ZK-190628, others), or estradiol-3-O-sulfamate, is a steroid sulfatase (STS) inhibitor which is under development for the treatment of endometriosis. It is the C3 sulfamate ester of estradiol, and was originally thought to be a prodrug of estradiol.

== Discovery ==
The drug was first synthesized as an STS inhibitor along with its oxidized version estrone 3-O-sulfamate (EMATE) in the group of Professor Barry V L Potter at the University of Bath, UK, working together with Professor Michael J Reed at Imperial College, London and was found to be highly estrogenic in rodents. Such aryl sulfamate esters were shown to be "first-in-class" highly potent active site-directed irreversible STS inhibitors. Compounds of this class are thought to irreversibly modify the active site formylglycine residue of STS.

== Metabolism ==
The drug shows reduced susceptibility to first-pass metabolism relative to estradiol, and was believed to be the first "potent" estradiol prodrug to be discovered.

Unlike estradiol and other estradiol esters, due to its unique sulfamate ester, E2MATE is not hydrolyzed during the first pass with oral administration, and instead can only be cleaved into estradiol systemically. E2MATE itself shows no affinity for the estrogen receptor or estrogenic activity in vitro, requiring hydrolysis into estradiol for estrogenicity. In accordance, the systemic potency of oral E2MATE as an estrogen in rodents was found to be increased approximately 100-fold relative to that of oral estradiol, whereas its hepatotropic activity is increased only marginally, by about 2- to 3-fold. As such, E2MATE has virtually absent effects on estrogen-modulated liver functions with oral administration at typical dosages equivalent to those of estradiol and behaves much like parenterally or transdermally administered estradiol, thereby combining the advantages of transdermal estradiol with the convenience of oral administration. It has been determined that this is due to binding of E2MATE to carbonic anhydrase II in erythrocytes (red blood cells), which results in E2MATE being rapidly taken up into erythrocytes from the blood of the hepatic portal vein and bypassing the liver during the first pass with oral administration. Following this, E2MATE is slowly released from erythrocytes into the circulation. The X-ray crystal structure of EMATE in complex with carbonic anhydrase II has been determined.

However, it has been found that E2MATE, without being hydrolyzed first, can be converted by 17β-hydroxysteroid dehydrogenase into estrone sulfamate (EMATE), analogously to the conversion of estradiol into estrone. Moreover, EMATE is the dominant fraction found in the circulation, and EMATE is a potent STS inhibitor. As a result, EMATE prevents the bioactivation of itself and E2MATE into estrone and estradiol, respectively, which effectively abolishes their estrogenic activity in humans. In relation to these findings, according to Elger and colleagues, "In spite of high levels of [E2MATE] and EMATE in the circulation, only insignificant [estradiol] levels and no estrogenic effects were generated in humans. [...] Further, EMATE is a potent inhibitor of the STS. It is obvious from estrogenicity studies that this property impairs the release of estrone and [estradiol] in a species varied manner. STS inhibition in the human was probably the mechanism for very long lasting high [E2MATE]- and EMATE concentrations in erythrocytes compared to shorter initial peak values of [estrone] and [estradiol] in the plasma." As such, E2MATE and EMATE are not effective as estrogens in humans, and the researchers have subsequently developed new C17β sulfonamide ester prodrugs of estradiol, such as EC508, that cannot be transformed into the corresponding estrone equivalents and are not STS inhibitors.

STS is an enzyme that is responsible for the transformation of hormonally inactive steroid sulfates into their hormonally active forms, for instance hydrolysis of estrone sulfate into estrone (which can then be transformed into the more potent estradiol). Inhibition of STS is the basis for the clinical development of E2MATE for endometriosis, as STS is expressed in the endometrium, and the severity of endometriosis has been found to correlate with STS expression. In a clinical study, E2MATE was found to inhibit endometrial STS activity by 91% in premenopausal women, while circulating levels of estradiol were not affected, indicating that E2MATE may have tissue-selective antiestrogenic effects in the endometrium.

E2MATE is rapidly and 90% transformed into EMATE in the intestines during the first pass with oral administration in women. EMATE and E2MATE are almost completely sequestered into erythrocytes from the hepatic portal vein during the first pass with oral administration, thereby bypassing the liver. Treatment with 4 mg oral E2MATE once per week has been found to result in very high maximal levels of E2MATE of 152.1 ng/mL (152,100 pg/mL) and of EMATE of 2,395 ng/mL (2,395,000 pg/mL) in women. Maximal levels of E2MATE and EMATE occur about 3.5 to 5.5 days after a dose of E2MATE. There is a 4.0-fold accumulation of E2MATE and a 3.3-fold accumulation of EMATE with continuous administration of E2MATE relative to a single dose. The biological half-life of E2MATE with continuous administration has been found to be about 18 days and of EMATE about 16 days in women.

== Research ==
It was clinically investigated for possible use as an estrogen for indications like hormonal contraception and menopausal hormone therapy. However, it showed no estrogenic effects in women. The potent non-estrogenic clinical STS inhibitor Irosustat (STX64/667-Coumate) was used to explore the possibility that STS might be responsible for the hydrolysis of estrogen sulphamates. Results demonstrated convincingly that STS is the enzyme responsible for the removal of the sulfamoyl group from estrogen sulfamates and has a crucial role in regulating the estrogenicity associated with this class of drug. Thus, STS inhibition blocks the conversion of E2MATE into estradiol and thereby abolishes its estrogenicity in humans. Irosustat has completed a number of clinical trials in oncology as an STS inhibitor currently up to Phase II.

STS inhibition was also found to be a potential new therapy for endometriosis. Following this, E2MATE was repurposed as an STS inhibitor for the treatment of estrogen-dependent conditions like endometriosis. As of 2017, E2MATE is in phase II clinical trials for endometriosis.

== See also ==
- List of estrogen esters § Estradiol esters
- List of investigational sex-hormonal agents § Estrogenics
- Steroid sulfatase § Inhibitors
