= Ammonium sulfamate =

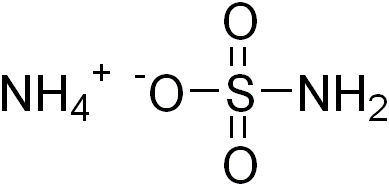

Names
- IUPAC name Ammonium sulfamate
- Other names Ammonium sulphamate Ammate herbicide Ammonium amidosulfonate

Identifiers
| CAS Number | 7773-06-0 |
| 3D model (JSmol) | Interactive image |
| ChemSpider | 22890 |
| ECHA InfoCard | 100.028.974 |
| KEGG | C18773 |
| PubChem CID | 24482 |
| RTECS number | WO6125000 |
| UNII | 945C6IU09L |
| CompTox Dashboard (EPA) | DTXSID5023875 |
- InChI: InChI=1S/H3NO3S.H3N/c1-5(2,3)4;/h(H3,1,2,3,4);1H3 Key: GEHMBYLTCISYNY-UHFFFAOYSA-N; InChI=1/H3NO3S.H3N/c1-5(2,3)4;/h(H3,1,2,3,4);1H3 Key: GEHMBYLTCISYNY-UHFFFAOYAI
- SMILES: [O-]S(=O)(=O)N.[NH4+]

Properties
| Chemical formula | [NH_{4}]SO_{3}NH_{2} |
| Molar mass | 114.125 g/mol |
| Appearance | White solid hygroscopic |
| Density | 1.8 g/cm^{3} |
| Melting point | 131 °C (268 °F; 404 K) |
| Boiling point | 160 °C (320 °F; 433 K) (decomposes) |
| Solubility in water | very soluble |
| Solubility | soluble in glycerol, glycol, formamide slightly soluble in ethanol insoluble in methanol, ether, n-octanol |
| Acidity (pK_{a}) | 6 |

Hazards
- Occupational safety and health (OHS/OSH)
| Main hazards | Irritant |
| NFPA 704 (fire diamond) | 2 0 0 |
| Flash point | Non-flammable |
- Lethal dose or concentration (LD, LC)
| LD_{50} (median dose) | 2000 mg/kg (oral, rat); 3100 mg/kg (oral, mouse); 3900 mg/kg (oral, rat); 5760 mg/kg (oral, mouse) |
- NIOSH (US health exposure limits)
| PEL (Permissible) | TWA 15 mg/m^{3} (total) TWA 5 mg/m^{3} (resp) |
| REL (Recommended) | TWA 10 mg/m^{3} (total) TWA 5 mg/m^{3} (resp) |
| IDLH (Immediate danger) | 1500 mg/m^{3} |
| Safety data sheet (SDS) | ICSC 1555 |
- Except where otherwise noted, data are given for materials in their standard state (at 25 °C [77 °F], 100 kPa). verify (what is ?) Infobox references

Ammonium sulfamate (or ammonium sulphamate) is a white crystalline solid, readily soluble in water. It is commonly used as a broad spectrum herbicide, with additional uses as a compost accelerator, flame retardant and in industrial processes.

== Manufacture and distribution ==
It is a salt formed from ammonia and sulfamic acid.

Ammonium sulfamate is distributed under the following tradenames, which are principally herbicidal product names: Amicide, Amidosulfate, Ammate, Amcide, Ammate X-NI, AMS, Fyran 206k, Ikurin, Sulfamate, AMS and Root-Out.

== Uses ==
=== Herbicide ===
Ammonium sulfamate is considered to be particularly useful in controlling tough woody weeds, tree stumps and brambles.

Ammonium sulfamate has been successfully used in several major UK projects by organisations like the British Trust for Conservation Volunteers, English Heritage, the National Trust, and various railway, canal and waterways authorities.

Several years ago the Henry Doubleday Research Association (HDRA) (known as Garden Organic), published an article on ammonium sulfamate after a successful set of herbicide trials. Though not approved for use by organic growers it does provide an option when alternatives have failed.

The following problem weeds / plants can be controlled: Japanese Knotweed (Reynoutria japonica, syn. Fallopia japonica), Marestail / Horsetail (Equisetum), Ground-elder (Aegopodium podagraria), Rhododendron ponticum, Brambles, Brushwood, Ivy (Hedera species), Senecio/Ragwort, Honey fungus (Armillaria), and felled tree stumps and most other tough woody specimens.

=== Compost accelerator ===
Ammonium sulfamate is used as a composting accelerator in horticultural settings. It is especially effective in breaking down the tougher and woodier weeds put onto the compost heap.

=== Flame retardant ===
Ammonium sulfamate (like other ammonium salts, e.g. ammonium dihydrogen phosphate, ammonium sulfate) is a useful flame retardant. These salt based flame retardants offer advantages over other metal/mineral-based flame retardants in that they are water processable. Their relatively low decomposition temperature makes them suitable for flame retarding cellulose based materials (paper/wood). Ammonium sulfamate (like ammonium dihydrogen phosphate) is sometimes used in conjunction with magnesium sulfate or ammonium sulfate (in ratios of approximately 2:1) for enhanced flame retardant properties.

=== Other uses ===
Within industry ammonium sulfamate is used as a flame retardant, a plasticiser and in electro-plating. Within the laboratory it is used as a reagent.

== Safety ==
Ammonium sulfamate is considered to be only slightly toxic to humans and other animals, making it appropriate for amateur home garden, professional and forestry uses. It is generally accepted to be safe for use on plots of land that will be used for growing fruit and vegetables intended for consumption.

It corrodes brass, copper, and iron. Its contact with eyes or skin can be harmful unless it is quickly washed off.

In the United States, the Occupational Safety and Health Administration has set a permissible exposure limit at 15 mg/m^{3} over an eight-hour time-weighted average, while the National Institute for Occupational Safety and Health recommends exposures no greater than 10 mg/m^{3} over an eight-hour time-weighted average. These occupational exposure limits are protective values, given the IDLH concentration is set at 1500 mg/m^{3}.

It is also considered to be environmentally friendly due to its degradation to non-harmful residues.

=== European Union licensing ===
The pesticides review by the European Union led to herbicides containing ammonium sulfamate becoming unlicensed, and therefore effectively banned, from 2008.

Its availability and use as a compost accelerator is unaffected by the EU's pesticide legislation.

== See also ==
- Sulfamide
