= Irosustat =

Chemical compound

Clinical data
- Other names: Oristusane; STX-64; 667-Coumate; BN-83495; STX-64PC
- Routes of administration: By mouth

Pharmacokinetic data
- Elimination half-life: 24 hours

Identifiers
- IUPAC name: (6-oxo-8,9,10,11-tetrahydro-7H-cyclohepta[c]chromen-3-yl) sulfamate
- CAS Number: 288628-05-7
- PubChem CID: 5287541
- DrugBank: DB02292
- ChemSpider: 4449897
- UNII: 366037O6O7
- KEGG: D09915
- CompTox Dashboard (EPA): DTXSID50183059

Chemical and physical data
- Formula: C_{14}H_{15}NO_{5}S
- Molar mass: 309.34 g·mol^{−1}
- 3D model (JSmol): Interactive image
- SMILES: C1CCC2=C(CC1)C(=O)OC3=C2C=CC(=C3)OS(=O)(=O)N
- InChI: InChI=1S/C14H15NO5S/c15-21(17,18)20-9-6-7-11-10-4-2-1-3-5-12(10)14(16)19-13(11)8-9/h6-8H,1-5H2,(H2,15,17,18); Key:DSLPMJSGSBLWRE-UHFFFAOYSA-N

Irosustat (INN, USAN; developmental code names STX-64, 667-coumate, BN-83495; also known as oristusane) is an orally active, irreversible, nonsteroidal inhibitor of steroid sulfatase (STS) and member of the aryl sulfamate ester class of drugs that was under development by Sterix Ltd and Ipsen for the treatment of hormone-sensitive cancers such as breast cancer, prostate cancer, and endometrial cancer but has not yet been marketed. The drug was first designed and synthesized in the group of Professor Barry V L Potter at the Department of Pharmacy & Pharmacology, University of Bath, working together with Professor Michael J. Reed at Imperial College, London and its initial development was undertaken through the university spin-out company Sterix Ltd and overseen by Cancer Research UK (CRUK). Results of the "first-in-class" clinical trial in breast cancer of an STS inhibitor in humans were published in 2006 and dose optimisation studies and further clinical data have been reported.

== Mechanism of action ==
By inhibiting STS, irosustat prevents the conversion of hormonally inactive steroid sulfates such as DHEA sulfate (DHEA-S) and estrone sulfate (E1S) into their respective active forms, DHEA and estrone (which, in turn, can be transformed into more potent androgens and estrogens, respectively).

The X-ray crystal structure of the drug bound to CAII has been determined.

== Pharmacokinetics ==
Despite Irosustat being quickly degraded in plasma ex vivo, this is prevented in vivo by its sequestration almost completely inside red blood cells after oral administration, being bound to carbonic anhydrase II (CA II) like its parent steroidal sulfamate ester E2MATE and thus avoiding first pass metabolism.

== Clinical development ==
In 2004 Sterix Ltd was acquired by Ipsen and Irosustat continued in development through formal academic-industry partnerships by Ipsen with the University of Bath and Imperial College. The drug reached phase II clinical trials in women with hormone-dependent breast cancer and endometrial cancer prior to the discontinuation of its initial development by Ipsen as a monotherapy for endometrial cancer in women with advanced/metastatic or recurrent estrogen-receptor positive endometrial cancer after a futility analysis of trial data. Results published in 2017 showed clinical activity and a good safety profile for Irosustat, with 36% of patients on Irosustat alive without progression at 6 months; 11% showed responses and there was more stable disease noted (47%) compared to the current therapy (32%), the progestin megestrol acetate (MA). However, overall there were no statistically significant differences between Irosustat and the current standard of care MA in response and survival rates. It also reached a phase I trial in the US for prostate cancer, being safe and well tolerated in male patients with castration-resistant prostate cancer and ongoing androgen deprivation therapy. Pharmacodynamic proof of concept was demonstrated with Irosustat effecting nearly complete STS inhibition at three doses, and in all patients there was notable suppression of endocrine parameters. The development of Irosustat has continued with clinical trials overseen by CRUK designed to explore its activity in early breast cancer (IPET trial) and also in combination with an aromatase inhibitor (AI) (IRIS trial). The multicentre IRIS trial, an open-label phase II clinical study, explored the clinical value of adding an STS inhibitor in addition to a first-line AI in patients with advanced breast cancer and enrolled postmenopausal women with ER+ locally advanced or metastatic breast cancer who had benefited from a first-line AI but were subsequently progressing. The IPET trial was a pre-surgical window-of-opportunity study, assessing Irosustat for the first time in ER+ early breast cancer and recruiting postmenopausal women with untreated early disease. Importantly, these data are the first to demonstrate clinical activity of Irosustat in early breast cancer, albeit in a small patient population. The results of both trials were published in 2017, showing evidence of clinical benefit and underpinning the scientific concept of STS inhibition. Larger studies are now required. Irosustat was also evaluated as a combination therapy with an oral epidermal growth factor receptor tyrosine kinase inhibitor for the treatment of Non-Small Cell Lung Cancer Patients. Clinical development continues and the current status was reviewed in 2018.

Administration of 5 mg/day irosustat to women with breast cancer for 5 days inhibited STS activity by 98 to 99% in breast tumor tissue and significantly decreased serum levels of estrone (by 76%), estradiol (by 39%), DHEA (by 41%), androstenediol (by 70%), androstenedione (by 62%), and testosterone (by 30%), whereas levels of DHEA-S and E1S increased slightly (by 1.1% and 7.4%, respectively).

== Animal studies ==
Importantly, it was demonstrated that oral treatment with Irosustat alleviates the symptoms of Alzheimer’s Disease in a murine model, indicating that the drug passes the blood–brain barrier. STS inhibitors could therefore potentially be employed to treat aging and aging-associated diseases.

== See also ==
in patients.

- Steroid sulfatase § Inhibitors
