= Jenapharm =

German pharmaceutical company

Jenapharm GmbH & Co. KG

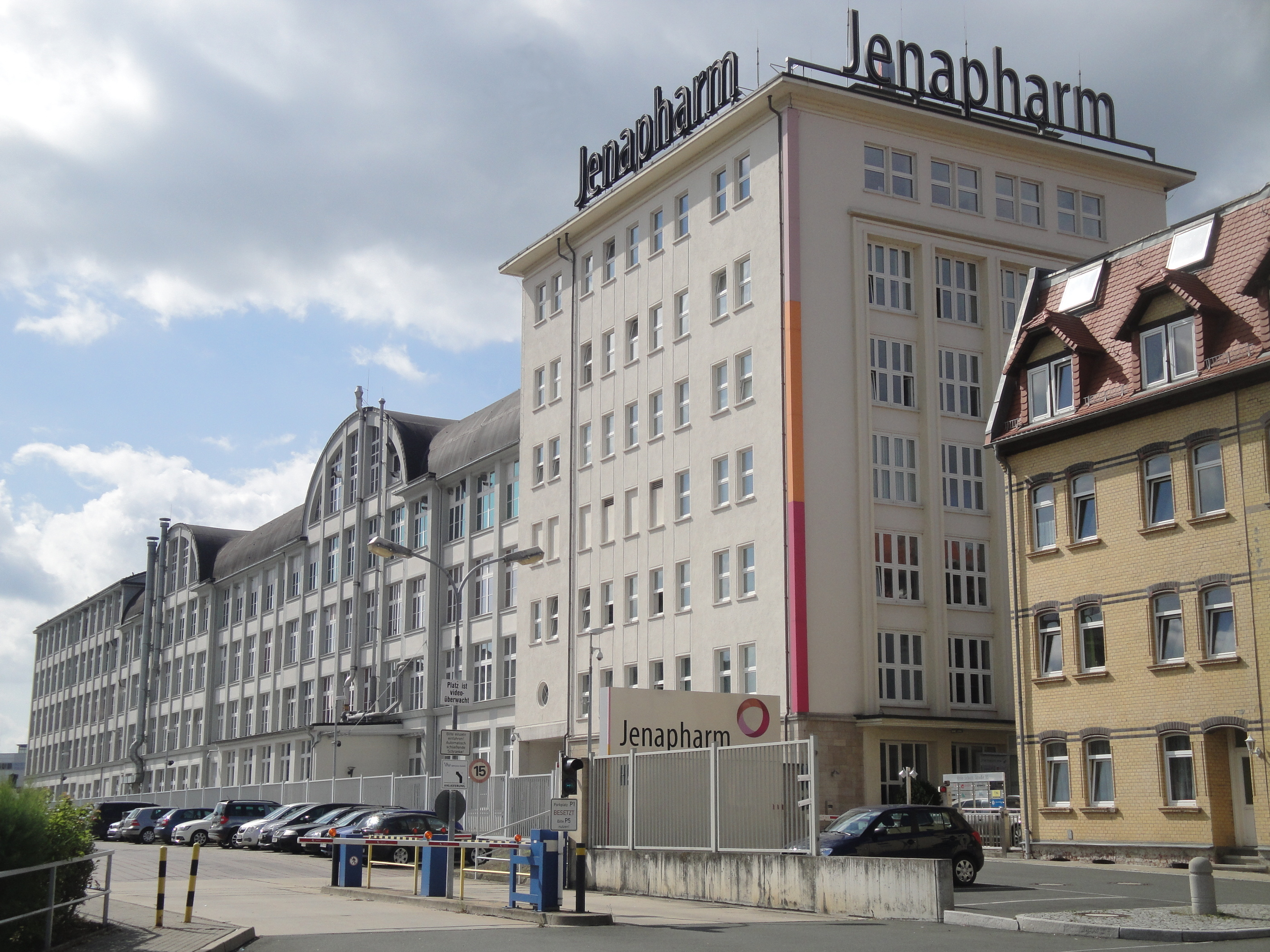
- Type: Subsidiary
- Industry: Pharmaceutical
- Founded: 1950 VEB Jenapharm
- Headquarters: Jena, Germany
- Products: fertility control hormone replacement
- Revenue: €135,2 million (2004)
- Net income: 20,100,000 (2023)
- Owner: Bayer Pharma AG
- Website: www.jenapharm.de

Jenapharm is a pharmaceutical company from Jena, Germany. Founded in 1950 in East Germany, the company focused from the beginning on the production and development of steroids. Because of the economic circumstances of the Eastern Bloc, the company initially used a unique process of steroid synthesis starting from hog bile, however, this method was abandoned a decade later in favor of total synthesis. Initially the company produced a wide range of generic steroids, including corticosteroids, but later on it focused on anabolic steroids, estrogens and progestins.

Prior to Germany's reunification Jenapharm was the only supplier of hormonal contraceptives in East Germany. It successfully marketed a number of drugs it had developed in collaboration with other East German chemists. Perhaps the most well known of these is Valette, which sold well in Germany in the 1990s. After the reunification, Jenapharm eventually became a subsidiary of Schering AG, which sold its generic therapeutics businesses to Dermapharm AG in 2004, and a year later restructured the marketing and distribution of Jenapharm into an independent subsidiary while integrating the research and development branch with its own laboratories.

East Germany had been running a state-sponsored mass doping program for its athletes with anabolic steroids, mostly with Oral Turinabol, a product that Jenapharm had developed. In 2005, the company was sued or threatened with lawsuits by hundreds of athletes who were forced to take these drugs. The company settled the lawsuits by contributing to the creation of a $4.1 million fund that compensated former athletes.

== History ==
During the occupation of Germany at the end of World War II, all pharmaceutical companies from Nazi Germany were located in the Western-occupied areas. Jena, which fell in the Soviet-controlled area, had an Institute for Microbiology — the Schott-Zeiss Institute — that had the prerequisites for small scale pharmaceutical production. Although the institute had been founded in 1944, with just 9 employees, Hans Knöll produced there the first batch of penicillin made in Germany, right before the end of the war. In 1948, the institute was producing 10 billion IUs of penicillin per month.

In the late 1940s, rickets was rampant amongst the children in the Soviet-occupied zone. In 1949, Alfred Schubert, who first developed a method of synthesis of vitamin D_{2} at the Friedrich-Schiller University, set up and industrial process that produced about 10 kg/year of Vitamin D_{2}. (Vitamin D_{2} was superseded by vitamin D_{3} 10 years later). In the same year the institute was tasked to synthesize steroid hormones, in particular cortisone. At the end of 1949, it received official permission to manufacture and market pharmaceuticals, and the public company VEB Jenapharm was founded on January 1, 1950. At the time the company already had about 600 employees.

Diosgenin and hecogenin, which were commonly used in the West as precursors for steroid synthesis, were not available in East Germany, and for political and economic reasons, these substances could not be imported. Jenapharm developed an alternate process starting from hyodesoxycholic acid extracted from hog bile, from which they first produced pregnenolone, and subsequently progesterone and desoxycorticosterone acetate in 1954/1955. In that decade research and production continued to be closely intertwined at Jenapharm. Alfred Schubert was both Research Director and manager of the plant that produced steroids.

Between 1957 and 1962, Gerhard Langbein further expanded the gamut of steroids that Jenapharm produced using its unique process to include testosterone, 4-chlorotestosterone, cortexolone, cortisone, cortisol and prednisone. Chlormadinone acetate was the first oral contraceptive produced by Jenapharm. It was sold under the name Ovosiston starting in 1964, and was also produced from hog bile.

In the 1960s, East German scientists tried to find an alternative to hog bile as the precursor for steroid synthesis by cultivating Solanum auriculatum, but these efforts failed to achieve industrial scale. Attempts to use sugar cane wax from Cuba or cholesterol from animal spinal cords also proved uneconomical. To remain competitive on the steroids market Jenapharm moved towards total synthesis. They used Igor Torgov's synthesis scheme, which was not patented in the GDR, and ironically was ignored by other Soviet chemists. Initially Jenapharm managed to produce only 25–75 kg of entirely synthetic steroids annually, but after tuning the process through more than 100 patented improvements, production reached about 5 tons per year in the 1980s. The move to total synthesis forced however Jenepharm to abandon the corticosteroids market.

At the end of 1980s, Jenapharm had sales of around DM200m ($112m) and 1700 employees, and was amongst eastern Germany's three largest pharmaceuticals producers with production plants at Jena, Erfurt, Naumburg and Magdeburg. It produced a wide range of products, but 50% of sales were in hormone products. In 1991, Jenapharm was privatized and sold to Gehe AG, a subsidiary of Franz Haniel & Cie GmbH, after an initial bid by Schering AG failed, but by October 2001, Schering had acquired 100% ownership of Jenapharm stock. In 2004, Jenapharm sold its therapeutics division and relocated its research activities to Berlin.

== Original products ==
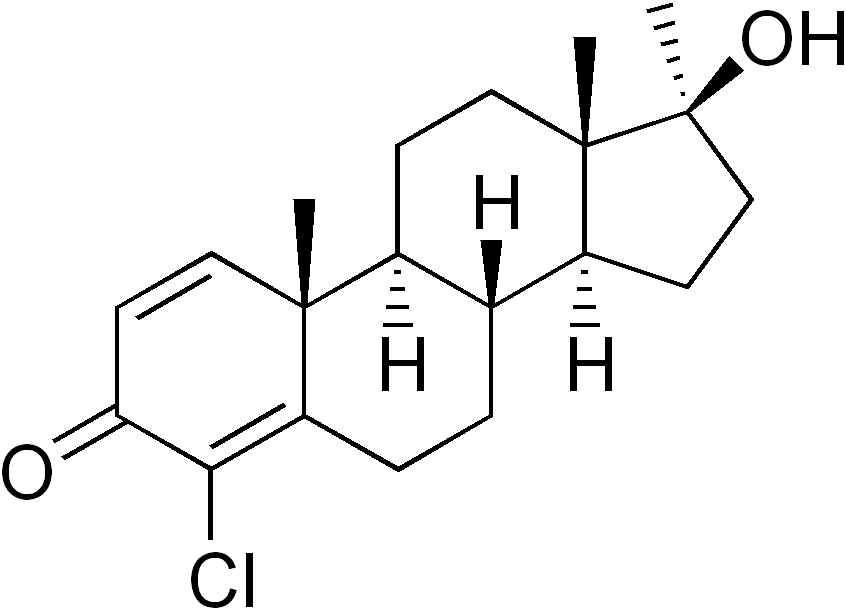
Skeletal formula of Oral Turinabol

In the 1960s, Jenapharm had fewer than 40 employees working on developing new products. This lack of dedicate resources translated in few original products. The first original product developed at Jenapharm was 4-chlorodehydromethyltestosterone, an anabolic steroid which was marketed under the name Oral Turinabol. This product later became infamous for being the most often used anabolic steroid in doping East German athletes under a state-sponsored program.

In 1967, Jenapharm, using mechanisms of the centralized East German economy, initiated a collaboration with other chemists from the East German Academy of Sciences to synthesize strongly active estrogens with a depot effect. This effort bore fruit a decade later. In 1978, the company brought to market the first once-a-week oral contraceptive Deposiston, a combination of ethinylestradiol sulfonate and norethisterone acetate. The other product that resulted from this collaboration was Turisteron (ethinylestradiol sulfonate) that proved efficacious in treating androgen-dependent carcinoma of the prostate.

Chemical structure of dienogest

In 1975, Kurt Ponsold, in cooperation with Jenapharm, synthesized a new progestin — dienogest. The combination ethinylestradiol/dienogest was efficacious as oral contraceptive. It was marketed initially as Certostat, and later as Valette). After sales debuted in 1990, within only a few years Valette become the most sold oral contraceptive on the German market. Jenapharm managed to take the top spot in German market share for oral contraceptives with 18%, compared with Schering's 13-14%. In 1996, Valette had annual sales of DM40m. This was a compelling reason to Schering to acquire Jenapharm.

== Doping and lawsuits ==
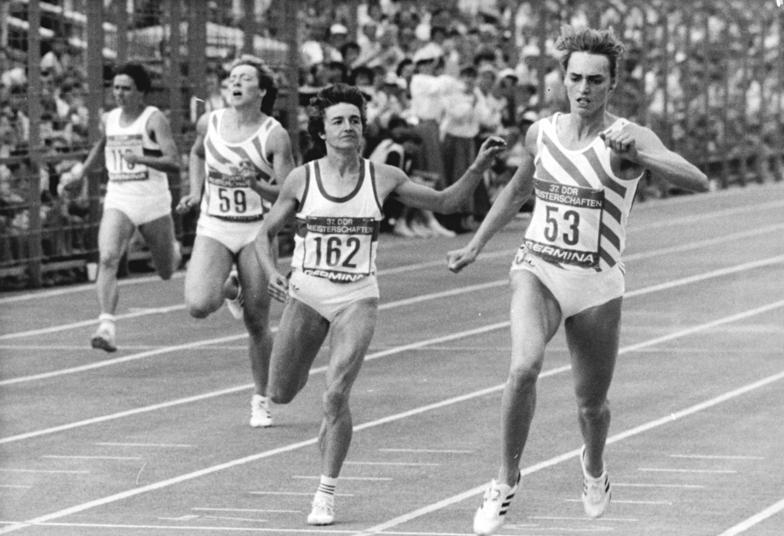
Heike Drechsler, Silke Gladisch, and Sabine Rieger, who set multiple world records, had an ambiguous relationship with the use of AAS.

Starting from 1966, East Germany ran a vast state-sponsored program of doping. The state gave grants and organized symposia where scientists and physicians who served as unofficial collaborators for the Ministry for State Security ("Stasi"), including top-ranking professors, collaborated on doping research and methods of drug administration that would evade detection by international doping controls. GDR physicians administered prescription drugs as well as unapproved experimental drug preparations to several thousand athletes every year, including to minors of both sexes. Special emphasis was placed on administering androgens to women and adolescent girls because this practice proved to be particularly effective for improving sports performance.

In the 1980s, doping tests at Olympic events became more widespread and effective. A symposium to face this problem was held in Leipzig on June 24, 1981. In the ensuing years nasal spray preparations containing testosterone or androstenedione were developed in collaboration with Jenapharm, tested, and used in top athletes—some of whom did not like this mode of application. Doping tests at the time used the T:E (testosterone:epitestosterone) ratio. Since 1983, Jenapharm had produced preparations of epitestosterone propionate, a biologically inactive compound that had no commercial value but was prepared exclusively for the governmental doping system. It was used simultaneously or sequentially with testosterone injections to bring the T:E ratio back into the normal range, but only for athletes participating in international competitions. This protocol made it possible for female athletes to receive high testosterone dosages and still pass doping tests, but it had strong virilizing effects, in particular hirsutism and voice changes. Concomitant consumption of alcohol or contraceptive pills led to severe and sometimes life-threatening liver damage. In male weight lifters cases of gynecomastia had to be resolved by surgery. All these side effects, as well the athletic improvements were meticulously documented in reports to the Stasi.

In 2005, some 160 former athletes, facing spiraling medical costs from the long term side effects of anabolic steroids, sued Jenapharm. Some of the female athletes had suffered multiple miscarriages. Many of the former athletes did not qualify for state medical insurance because they have been too ill to work. Initially Jenapharm denied responsibility for their condition, arguing that Oral Turinabol had been legally approved in the GDR and available on the market, but was misused by sports physicians and trainers. Lawyers representing the athletes argued that research from files left behind by Stasi secret police showed that Jenapharm also passed non-approved substances to trainers and withheld information about their side effects, thereby breaking the law. Another argument brought by the athletes was that Jenapharm manufactured substances that had no use other than doping, and that the government pressure in East Germany was not so great that company were unable to refuse engaging in doping-related activities. Eventually, the German Olympic Sports Federation (DOSB), the legal successor to the former East German National Olympic Committee, compensated each athlete with €9,250 ($12,200). Jenapharm contributed to the $4.1 million fund. About $500,000 were set aside for future claims.
