= Estrone sulfamate =

Chemical compound

Clinical data
- Other names: EMATE; J994; Estrone-3-O-sulfamate; 17-Oxoestra-1,3,5(10)-trien-3-yl sulfamate; 3-[(Aminosulfonyl)oxy]estra-1,3,5(10)-trien-17-one
- Routes of administration: By mouth
- Drug class: Steroid sulfatase inhibitor

Identifiers
- IUPAC name: [(8R,9S,13S,14S)-13-Methyl-17-oxo-7,8,9,11,12,14,15,16-octahydro-6H-cyclopenta[a]phenanthren-3-yl] sulfamate
- CAS Number: 148672-09-7
- PubChem CID: 127676
- ChemSpider: 113266
- ChEMBL: ChEMBL122708

Chemical and physical data
- Formula: C_{18}H_{23}NO_{4}S
- Molar mass: 349.45 g·mol^{−1}
- 3D model (JSmol): Interactive image
- SMILES: C[C@]12CC[C@H]3[C@H]([C@@H]1CCC2=O)CCC4=C3C=CC(=C4)OS(=O)(=O)N
- InChI: InChI=1S/C18H23NO4S/c1-18-9-8-14-13-5-3-12(23-24(19,21)22)10-11(13)2-4-15(14)16(18)6-7-17(18)20/h3,5,10,14-16H,2,4,6-9H2,1H3,(H2,19,21,22)/t14-,15-,16+,18+/m1/s1; Key:RVKFQAJIXCZXQY-CBZIJGRNSA-N

Estrone sulfamate (EMATE; developmental code name J994), or estrone-3-O-sulfamate, is a steroid sulfatase (STS) inhibitor which has not yet been marketed. It is the C3 sulfamate ester of the estrogen estrone. Unlike other estrogen esters however, EMATE is not an effective prodrug of estrogens. A closely related compound is estradiol sulfamate (E2MATE), which is extensively metabolized into EMATE and has similar properties to it.

EMATE shows high bioavailability and undergoes little or no first-pass metabolism with oral administration. The sulfamate moiety of EMATE results in carbonic anhydrase binding which, in turn, results in EMATE being taken up into and stored in erythrocytes in the blood. Since this occurs in the hepatic portal vein, it prevents EMATE from entering the liver during the first pass with the oral route. The inhibition of STS by EMATE prevents its bioactivation into estrone and estradiol, which in turn accounts for the lack of estrogenicity of EMATE. A short initial peak of estradiol and estrone levels was observed with E2MATE at the start of treatment in humans, followed by very high and long-lasting concentrations of EMATE and estrone sulfate in erythrocytes, observations that are in accordance with STS inhibition.

EMATE is an extremely potent and irreversible inhibitor of STS. It was found to have an IC_{50} of 65 pM for STS inhibition in MCF-7 cells, with an almost complete inhibition of the hydrolysis of physiological concentrations of the steroid sulfates estrone sulfate and dehydroepiandrosterone sulfate in MCF-7 cells observed at a concentration of 1 μM. At a dosage of 1 mg/kg orally or subcutaneously in rats, it effectively abolished estrone and DHEA-S sulfatase activities in all tissues assessed. It also showed a prolonged duration of action, with only a small recovery (<10%) of hepatic STS activity occurring 7 days after a single 10 mg/kg dose in rats.

Due to its ability to prevent the conversion of hormonally inactive steroid sulfates into their hormonally active forms (e.g., estrone sulfate into estrone), STS inhibitors like EMATE have potential applications in the treatment of estrogen-dependent conditions like estrogen receptor-positive breast cancer and endometriosis. However, estrogenicity was paradoxically observed with EMATE in rodents, and this resulted in clinical development of the compound not being pursued. However, E2MATE was investigated as an estradiol prodrug with improved oral pharmacokinetics and little or no first-pass hepatic impact in humans, but was found to completely lack estrogenic effects. Following this, E2MATE was repurposed as an STS inhibitor, and is now under development for the treatment of endometriosis.

== See also ==
- List of estrogen esters § Estrone esters
- Steroid sulfatase § Inhibitors
