= Mike Reed (biochemist) =

British biochemist

Professor Mike Reed FRCPath

Professor of Steroid Biochemistry, Imperial College, London
- In office 1995–2009

Personal details
- Born: Michael J. Reed; 30 May 1944
- Died: 6 April 2009 (aged 64)

Michael J. Reed (30 May 1944 – 6 April 2009) was a British chemist who held the position of professor of steroid biochemistry at Imperial College, London.

== Scientific career ==
Reed obtained a BSc in zoology from the University of London in 1967 and an MSc in biochemistry from Imperial College in 1969. He then commenced research into the actions and metabolism of ethinyloestradiol with Ken Fotherby at the Royal Postgraduate Medical School, London, culminating in a PhD in 1973. He continued to work on the regulation of oestrogen synthesis in endometrial cancer before moving to St Mary's Hospital Medical School in 1976, to join Vivian James in the Department of Chemical Pathology. He then focused his attention to the regulation of aromatase in breast cancer.

Reed was appointed lecturer at St. Mary's in 1978, senior lecturer in 1983 and reader in 1992. His principal work was on in vivo methods, using radioactive substrate infusions to calculate the extent of aromatisation in postmenopausal women with breast cancer. In 1995 he was appointed professor of steroid biochemistry in the Department of Endocrinology and Metabolic Medicine.

After the creation of the Imperial College School of Medicine, Reed's research became more directed towards developing therapies. Together with A. Purohit, he developed a research programme in steroid sulphatase inhibitors for the control of steroid-responsive cancers. These studies attracted commercial funding and the creation of an Imperial Start-up – Sterix Ltd, formed in 1998 as a spin-off from Imperial College, London and the University of Bath, based on the work of Reed and Barry V L Potter (professor of medicinal chemistry, University of Bath) in the field of steroid hormones. It resulted the development of inhibitors for several steroidogenic enzyme targets. One of these completed a Phase 1 trial in women with advanced breast cancer, in collaboration with Charles Coombes and CRUK. Sterix was acquired by Ipsen in 2004.

== Awards and honours ==
Reed won the 2009 GlaxoSmithKline (GSK) International Achievement Award, jointly with Barry Potter. He also won The Royal Society of Chemistry BMCS Malcolm Campbell Memorial Award 2009, jointly with L.W.L. Woo and B.V.L. Potter from The University of Bath and A. Purohit from Imperial College.

A commemorative symposium was held on 6 April 2010 in Edinburgh to celebrate his scientific achievements. The symposium focused on the main area of Reed's research – the production and role of female sex hormones in women with hormone-dependent cancers.
