= Sulfamide =

Organosulfur compound

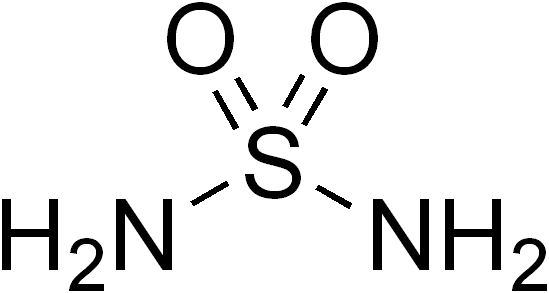

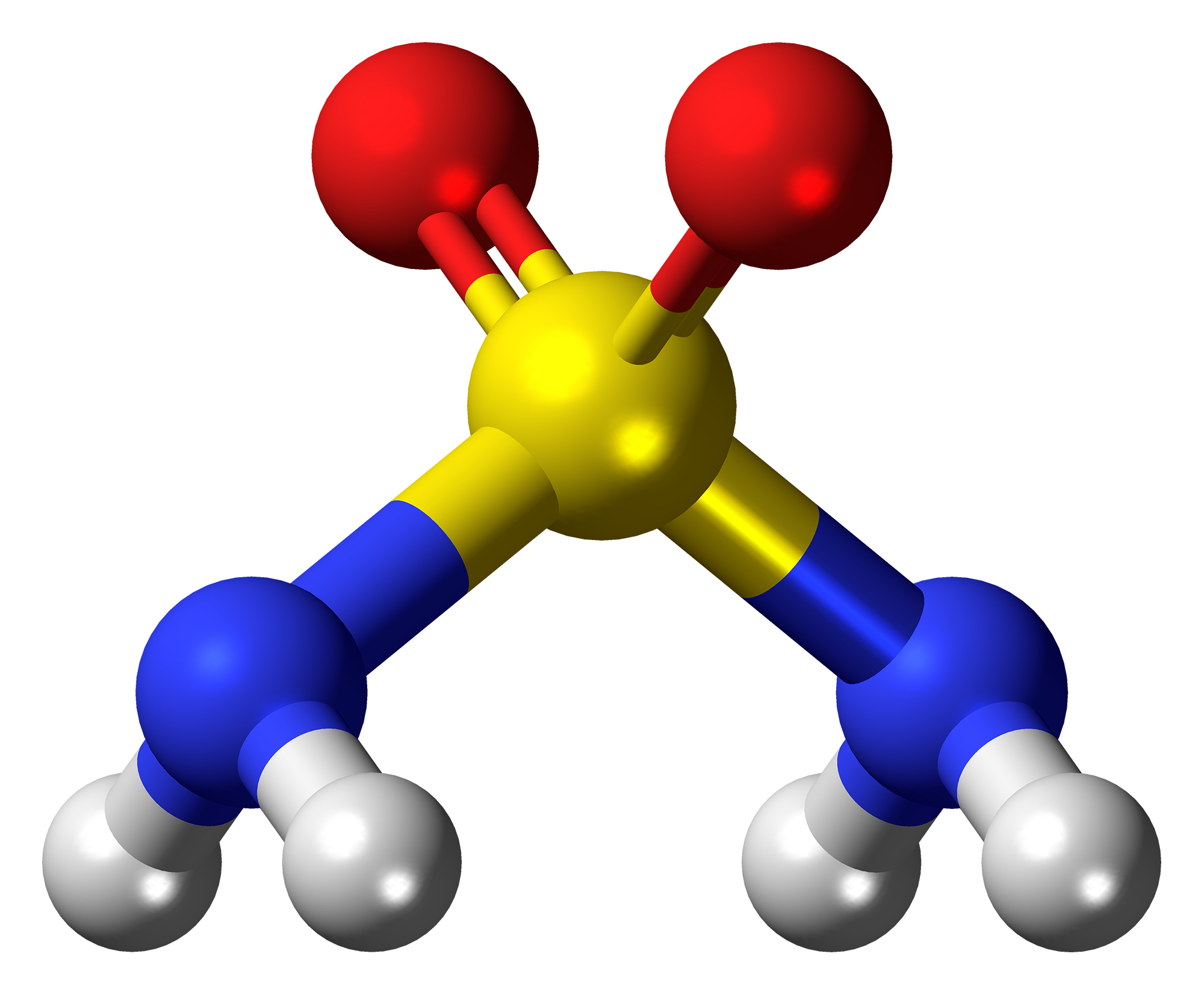

Names
- IUPAC name Sulfuric diamide
- Preferred IUPAC name Sulfamide
- Other names Sulphamide; Sulfuryl amide

Identifiers
CAS Number	7803-58-9
3D model (JSmol)	Interactive image
ChEBI	CHEBI:29368
ChEMBL	ChEMBL355001
ChemSpider	74243
ECHA InfoCard	100.029.330
PubChem CID	82267
UNII	VS7TZW634V
CompTox Dashboard (EPA)	DTXSID5064885
- InChI: InChI=1S/H4N2O2S/c1-5(2,3)4/h(H4,1,2,3,4) Key: NVBFHJWHLNUMCV-UHFFFAOYSA-N; InChI=1/H4N2O2S/c1-5(2,3)4/h(H4,1,2,3,4) Key: NVBFHJWHLNUMCV-UHFFFAOYAV
- SMILES: O=S(=O)(N)N

Properties
Chemical formula	H_{4}N_{2}O_{2}S
Molar mass	96.11 g/mol
Appearance	White orthorhombic plates
Melting point	93 °C (199 °F; 366 K)
Boiling point	250 °C (482 °F; 523 K) (decomposes)
Solubility in water	Freely soluble
Magnetic susceptibility (χ)	−44.4×10^{−6} cm^{3}/mol
- Except where otherwise noted, data are given for materials in their standard state (at 25 °C [77 °F], 100 kPa). verify (what is ?) Infobox references

Sulfamide (IUPAC name: sulfuric diamide) is a compound with the chemical formula SO_{2}(NH_{2})_{2} and structure H_{2}N−S(=O)_{2}−NH_{2}.

Sulfamide was first prepared in 1838 by the French chemist Henri Victor Regnault. It is produced by the reaction of sulfuryl chloride with ammonia. The process generally gives only about 50% sulfamide, "with the remaining products being imidodisulphamide, HN(SO_{2}NH_{2})_{2} and other longer-chain and cyclic condensation products."

== Sulfamide functional group ==
In organic chemistry, the term sulfamide may also refer to the functional group which consists of at least one organic group attached to a nitrogen atom of sulfamide.

Symmetric sulfamides can be prepared directly from amines, sulfur dioxide gas and an oxidant:

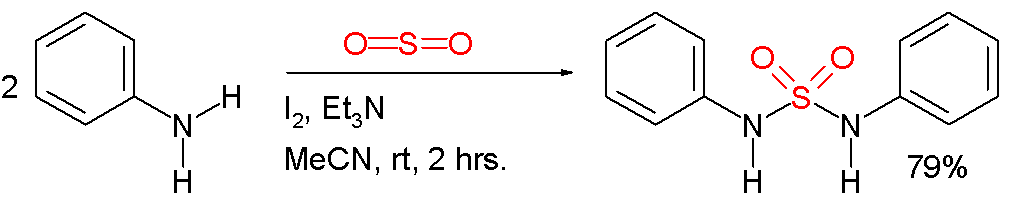

In this example, the reactants are aniline, triethylamine (Et_{3}N, Et = ethyl group), and iodine. Sulfur dioxide is believed to be activated through a series of intermediates: Et_{3}N−^{+}−I^{−}, Et_{3}N−I^{+}−I^{−}_{3} and Et_{3}N^{+}−SO^{−}_{2}.

The sulfamide functional group is an increasingly common structural feature used in medicinal chemistry.

== See also ==
- Sulfamic acid
- Sulfonamide
