= EC586 =

Chemical compound

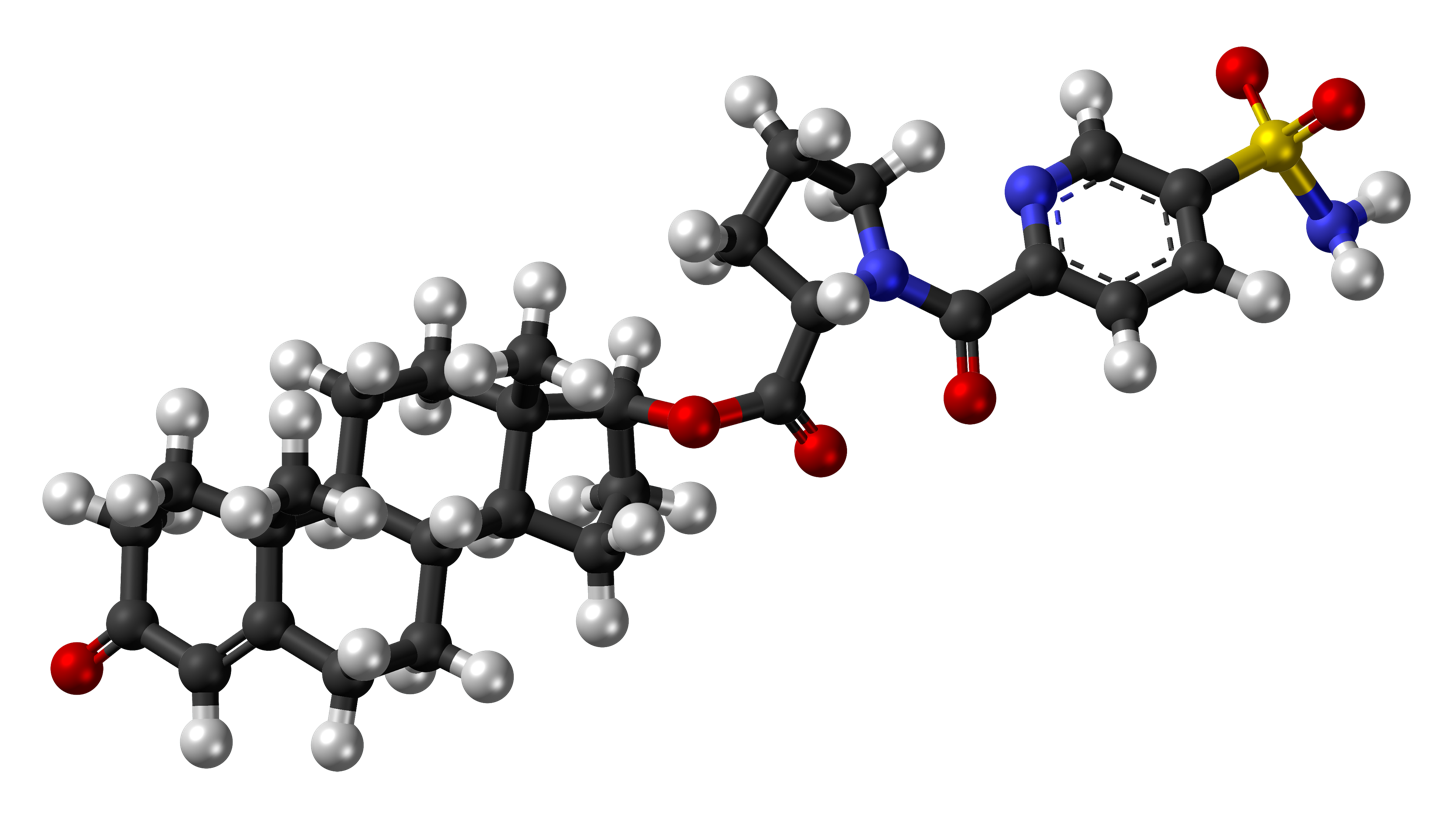

Clinical data
- Other names: EC-586; Testosterone 17β-(1-[[5-(aminosulfonyl)-2-pyridinyl]carbonyl]-L-proline); Androst-4-en-17β-ol-3-one 17β-(1-[[5-(aminosulfonyl)-2-pyridinyl]carbonyl]-L-proline); 3-Oxoandrost-4-en-17β-yl 1-[[5-(aminosulfonyl)-2-pyridinyl]carbonyl]-L-proline
- Drug class: Androgen; Anabolic steroid; Androgen ester

Identifiers
- IUPAC name: (8R,9S,10R,13S,14S,17S)-10,13-dimethyl-3-oxo-2,3,6,7,8,9,10,11,12,13,14,15,16,17-tetradecahydro-1H-cyclopenta[a]phenanthren-17-yl (5-sulfamoylpicolinoyl)-L-prolinate
- CAS Number: 2140269-95-8
- UNII: C86SA44JFY

Chemical and physical data
- Formula: C_{30}H_{39}N_{3}O_{6}S
- Molar mass: 569.72 g·mol^{−1}
- 3D model (JSmol): Interactive image
- SMILES: O=C1CC[C@]2(C)[C@@]3([H])CC[C@]4(C)[C@@H](OC([C@@H]5CCCN5C(C6=CC=C(S(N([H])[H])(=O)=O)C=N6)=O)=O)CC[C@@]4([H])[C@]3([H])CCC2=C1
- InChI: InChI=1S/C30H39N3O6S/c1-29-13-11-19(34)16-18(29)5-7-21-22-8-10-26(30(22,2)14-12-23(21)29)39-28(36)25-4-3-15-33(25)27(35)24-9-6-20(17-32-24)40(31,37)38/h6,9,16-17,21-23,25-26H,3-5,7-8,10-15H2,1-2H3,(H2,31,37,38)/t21-,22-,23-,25-,26-,29-,30-/m0/s1; Key:CYIIXLHIAANHDT-SFEKBMPBSA-N

EC586, also known as testosterone 17β-(1-((5-(aminosulfonyl)-2-pyridinyl)carbonyl)-L-proline), is an androgen and anabolic steroid which is under development by Evestra for use in androgen replacement therapy in men. It is an orally active androgen ester – specifically, a C17β sulfonamide–proline ester of the natural and bioidentical androgen testosterone – and acts as a prodrug of testosterone in the body. However, unlike oral testosterone and conventional oral testosterone esters such as testosterone undecanoate, EC586 has high oral potency, may undergo little or no first-pass metabolism, and may not have disproportionate androgenic effects in the liver. As such, it may have a variety of desirable advantages over oral testosterone, similarly to parenteral testosterone, but with the convenience of oral administration. Evestra intends to seek Investigational New Drug status for EC586 in the fourth quarter of 2018.

The pharmacokinetics of oral EC586 have been briefly assessed in rats in a small pilot study. Oral EC586 showed area-under-the-curve (AUC) levels that were more than 100-fold greater than those of oral testosterone propionate, the C17β propionate ester of testosterone (AUC_{0-3h} = 330 ng/mL and 2.5 ng/mL, respectively, for doses of 3.0 mg/rat each). As such, EC586 would appear to possess strongly increased oral bioavailability, potency, and systemic exposure relative to testosterone propionate. Additional research and details on the pharmacokinetics and properties of EC586 are to be published "soon".

The mechanism for the absence of first-pass metabolism and lack of disproportionate liver exposure with oral administration has been elucidated for a closely related sulfonamide–proline estradiol ester known as EC508, which shows the same properties as EC586.

Clinical trials for EC586 and EC508 are undergoing as of 2023.

== See also ==
- List of androgen esters § Testosterone esters
- List of investigational sex-hormonal agents § Androgenics
