= Igor Torgov =

Soviet and Russian chemist (1912–2007)

Igor Vladimirovich Torgov (Russian: Игорь Владимирович Торгов) (15 February (O.S. 2 February) 1912, Kazan - 2007) was a Soviet chemist and a corresponding member of the Soviet Academy of Sciences (1972).

Ivan Torgov graduated from Kazan Institute of Chemical Engineering in 1937 and then worked at a factory lab until 1939. In 1939–1959, he was employed at the Institute of Organic Chemistry of the Soviet Academy of Sciences. In 1959, Ivan Torgov was appointed head of steroid chemistry lab at the Institute of Natural Compounds Chemistry of the Soviet Academy of Sciences (today's Shemyakin Institute of Bioorganic Chemistry). Ivan Torgov's principal works are dedicated to the chemistry of natural compounds, mainly steroids. The Torgov reaction opened an original pathway for the total chemical synthesis of steroid hormones.

Ivan Torgov was awarded the Order of the Red Banner of Labour and numerous medals.
