= Estrogen-dependent condition =

An estrogen-dependent condition can be that relating to the differentiation in the steroid sex hormone that is associated with the female reproductive system and sex characteristics. These conditions can fall under the umbrella of hypoestrogenism, hyperestrogenism, or any sensitivity to the presence of estrogen in the body.

== Estrogen ==
Estrogen is a critical sex hormone for women (in conjunction with progesterone). Estrogen is responsible for all different functions in a female body, but is also seen in any gender. These functions are seen in body tracts such as the skeletal system, liver, brain and breasts. There are three different formulations of estrogen: estrone, estradiol, and estriol. These are commonly referred to as E1, E2, and E3, following the listing stated prior. These three formulations have different functions in a women's life. Estradiol (E2) is seen in the reproductive time period. Estriol (E3) is seen primarily during pregnancy. Finally, estrone (E1) is the form the body uses during the postmenopausal period. From all of the three formulations stated earlier, Estradiol (E2) is known to be the strongest. In a normal adult female, the normal range of estrogen in the luteal phase (when ovulation happens, as well as the vascular tissue preparing for the potential zygote) is 100 pg/ml, in comparison to the proliferative phase (when the uterine lining is thickening) 40-250 pg/ml.

== Known estrogen-dependent conditions ==
Known estrogen-dependent conditions include:

- mastodynia (breast pain/tenderness)
- breast fibroids
- mammoplasia (breast enlargement)
- macromastia (breast hypertrophy)
- gynecomastia
- breast cancer
- precocious puberty in girls and isosexual precocious puberty in boys
- melasma
- menorrhagia
- endometriosis
- endometrial hyperplasia
- adenomyosis
- uterine fibroids
- uterine cancers (e.g., endometrial cancer)
- ovarian cancer
- hyperestrogenism and associated feminization in males
  - such as in certain conditions like cirrhosis, Klinefelter's syndrome, and aromatase excess syndrome.

Such conditions may be treated with drugs with antiestrogen actions, including selective estrogen receptor modulators (SERMs) such as tamoxifen and clomifene, estrogen receptor antagonists such as fulvestrant, aromatase inhibitors such as anastrozole and exemestane, gonadotropin-releasing hormone (GnRH) analogues such as leuprorelin and cetrorelix, and/or other antigonadotropins such as danazol, gestrinone, megestrol acetate, and medroxyprogesterone acetate.

=== Menopause ===
Menopause is the state in which the menses cease to occur. This is seen throughout the years 49–52. This termination of menses is associated with a dramatic drop in estrogen levels. The estrogen levels stated previously dramatically decrease to approximately 20 pg/ml or less when menopause begins. Menopause falls under the umbrella of conditions related to hypoestrogenism. There are many symptoms associated with the transition and entrance into menopause.

=== Endometriosis ===
Endometriosis is an inflammatory condition characterized by the growth and development on the endometrium tissue, found within the uterus, is growing outside of the uterus. Endometriosis is commonly found on the ovaries and other organs near/in the pelvic cavity, but it has also been seen in other organs such as the spleen or lungs. A handful of the symptoms associated with endometriosis are dysmenorrhea, dyschezia, dyspareunia, menorrhagia, and fertility complications. This inflammatory disease shares numerous symptoms with other conditions, so this at times leads to misdiagnoses. Endometriosis can have a confirmed diagnosis with exploratory surgery. This surgery is generally called a laparoscopy.

=== Polyendocrine metabolic ovarian syndrome (PMOS) ===
Polyendocrine metabolic ovarian syndrome (PMOS) is seen as numerous cysts developing on the ovaries, and this can be seen with additional symptoms such as oligomenorrhea, hirsutism, acne, weight gain, and fertility issues. PMOS is caused by the ovaries having an excessive amount of male sex hormones. Because of this, PMOS is associated with hyperandrogenism.

== See also ==
- Androgen-dependent condition
- Estrogen insensitivity syndrome
