= Sulfamic acid =

- Tautomer of sulfamic acid

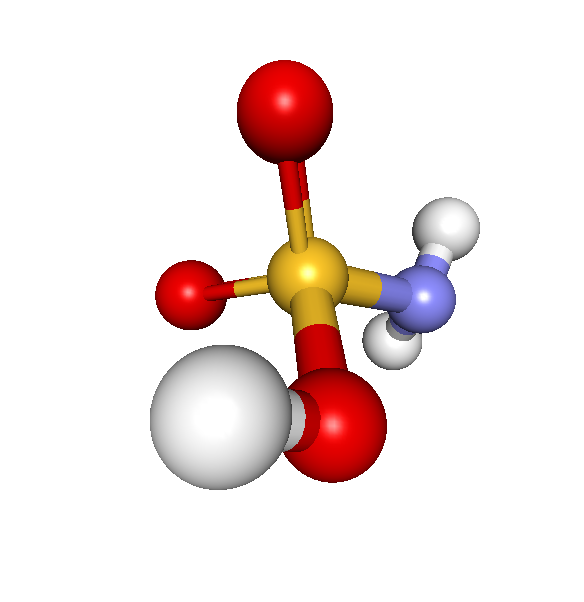
Ball-and-stick model of the canonical neutral form
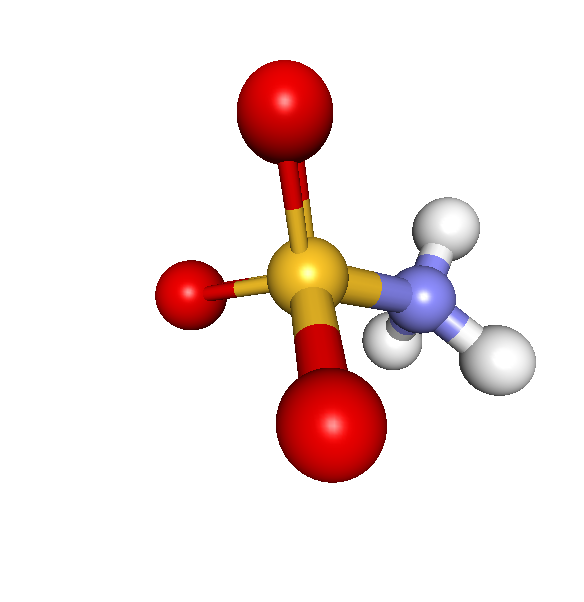
Ball-and-stick model of the zwitterionic form
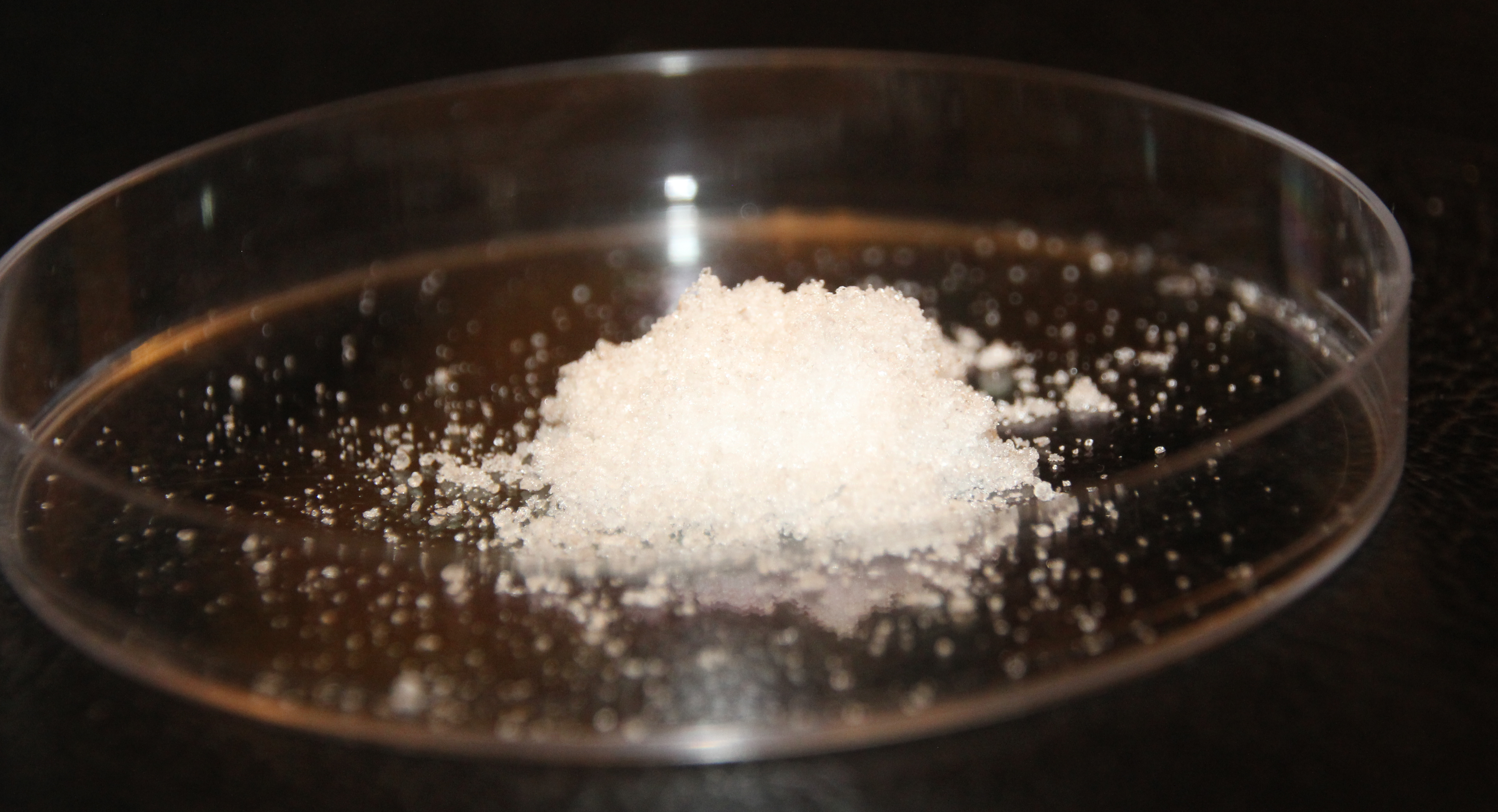

Names
- IUPAC name Sulfamic acid

Identifiers
CAS Number	5329-14-6
3D model (JSmol)	Interactive image; zwitterion: Interactive image
ChEBI	CHEBI:9330
ChEMBL	ChEMBL68253
ChemSpider	5767
ECHA InfoCard	100.023.835
EC Number	226-218-8
Gmelin Reference	25628
PubChem CID	5987
RTECS number	WO5950000
UNII	9NFU33906Q
UN number	2967
CompTox Dashboard (EPA)	DTXSID6034005
- InChI: InChI=1S/H3NO3S/c1-5(2,3)4/h(H3,1,2,3,4) Key: IIACRCGMVDHOTQ-UHFFFAOYSA-N; InChI=1/H3NO3S/c1-5(2,3)4/h(H3,1,2,3,4) Key: IIACRCGMVDHOTQ-UHFFFAOYAK
- SMILES: O=S(=O)(O)N; zwitterion: O=[S](=O)([O-])[NH3+]

Properties
Chemical formula	H_{3}NO_{3}S
Molar mass	97.09 g·mol^{−1}
Appearance	white crystals
Density	2.15 g/cm^{3}
Melting point	205 °C (401 °F; 478 K) decomposes
Solubility in water	Moderate, with slow hydrolysis
Solubility	Moderately soluble in DMF; Slightly soluble in MeOH; Insoluble in hydrocarbons
Acidity (pK_{a})	1.0

Hazards
- GHS labelling
Pictograms	(GHS07: Exclamation mark)
Signal word	Warning
Hazard statements	H315, H319, H412
Precautionary statements	P264, P273, P280, P302+P352, P305+P351+P338, P321, P332+P313, P337+P313, P362, P501
Safety data sheet (SDS)	ICSC 0328

Related compounds
Other cations	Ammonium sulfamate
- Except where otherwise noted, data are given for materials in their standard state (at 25 °C [77 °F], 100 kPa). verify (what is ?) Infobox references

Sulfamic acid, also known as amidosulfonic acid, amidosulfuric acid, aminosulfonic acid, sulphamic acid and sulfamidic acid, is a molecular compound with the formula H_{3}NSO_{3}. This colourless, water-soluble compound finds many applications. Sulfamic acid melts at 205 °C before decomposing at higher temperatures to water, sulfur trioxide, sulfur dioxide and nitrogen.

Sulfamic acid (H_{3}NSO_{3}) may be considered an intermediate compound between sulfuric acid (H_{2}SO_{4}) and sulfamide (H_{4}N_{2}SO_{2}), effectively replacing a hydroxyl (−OH) group with an amine (−NH_{2}) group at each step. This pattern can extend no further in either direction without breaking down the sulfonyl (−SO_{2}−) moiety. Sulfamates are derivatives of sulfamic acid.

== Production ==
Sulfamic acid is produced industrially by treating urea with a mixture of sulfur trioxide and sulfuric acid (or oleum). The conversion is conducted in two stages, the first being sulfamation:

OC(NH_{2})_{2} + SO_{3} → OC(NH_{2})(NHSO_{3}H)
OC(NH_{2})(NHSO_{3}H) + H_{2}SO_{4} → CO_{2} + 2 H_{3}NSO_{3}

In this way, approximately 96,000 tonnes were produced in 1995.

== Structure and reactivity ==
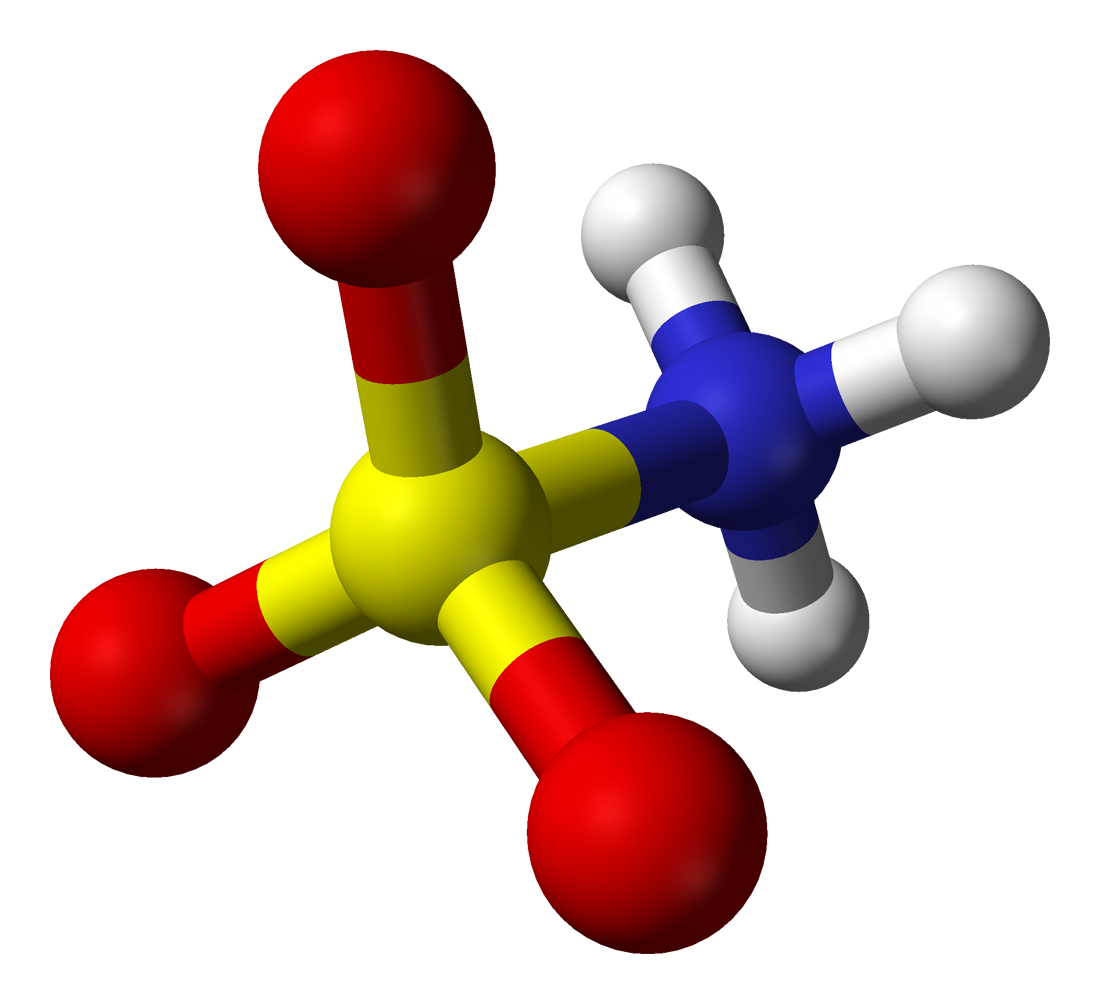
Ball-and-stick model of a sulfamic acid zwitterion as it occurs in the crystal state

The compound is well described by the formula H_{3}NSO_{3}, not the tautomer H_{2}NSO_{2}(OH). The relevant bond distances are 1.44 Å for the S=O and 1.77 Å for the S−N. The greater length of the S−N is consistent with a single bond. Furthermore, a neutron diffraction study located the hydrogen atoms, all three of which are 1.03 Å distant from the nitrogen. In the solid state, the molecule of sulfamic acid is well described by a zwitterionic form.

=== Hydrolysis ===
The crystalline solid is indefinitely stable under ordinary storage conditions; however, aqueous solutions of sulfamic acid slowly hydrolyse to ammonium bisulfate, according to the following reaction:

H_{3}NSO_{3} + H_{2}O → [NH_{4}]^{+}[HSO_{4}]^{−}

Its behaviour resembles that of urea, (H_{2}N)_{2}CO. Both feature amino groups linked to electron-withdrawing centres that can participate in delocalised bonding. Both liberate ammonia upon heating in water, with urea releasing CO_{2}, while sulfamic acid releases sulfuric acid.

=== Acid–base reactions ===
Sulfamic acid is a moderately strong acid, K_{a} = 0.101 (pK_{a} = 0.995). Because the solid is not hygroscopic, it is used as a standard in acidimetry (quantitative assays of acid content).

H_{3}NSO_{3} + NaOH → NaH_{2}NSO_{3} + H_{2}O

Double deprotonation can be effected in liquid ammonia to give the anion HNSO^{2−}_{3}.

H_{3}NSO_{3} + 2 NH_{3} → HNSO^{2−}_{3} + 2 NH^{+}_{4}

=== Reaction with nitric and nitrous acids ===
With nitrous acid, sulfamic acid reacts to give nitrogen:

HNO_{2} + H_{3}NSO_{3} → H_{2}SO_{4} + N_{2} + H_{2}O

while with concentrated nitric acid, it affords nitrous oxide:

HNO_{3} + H_{3}NSO_{3} → H_{2}SO_{4} + N_{2}O + H_{2}O

=== Reaction with hypochlorite ===
The reaction of excess hypochlorite ions with sulfamic acid or a sulfamate salt gives rise reversibly to both N-chlorosulfamate and N,N-dichlorosulfamate ions.

HClO + H_{2}NSO_{3}H → ClNHSO_{3}H + H_{2}O
HClO + ClNHSO_{3}H ⇌ Cl_{2}NSO_{3}H + H_{2}O

Consequently, sulfamic acid is used as hypochlorite scavenger in the oxidation of aldehydes with chlorite such as the Pinnick oxidation.

=== Reaction with alcohols ===
Upon heating, sulfamic acid reacts with alcohols to form the corresponding organosulfates. It is more expensive than other reagents for doing this, such as chlorosulfonic acid or oleum, but is also significantly milder and does not sulfonate aromatic rings. Products are produced as their ammonium salts. Such reactions can be catalyzed by the presence of urea. Without the presence of any catalysts, sulfamic acid does not react with ethanol at temperatures below 100 °C.

ROH + H_{2}NSO_{3}H → ROS(O)_{2}O^{−} + NH^{+}_{4}

An example of this reaction is the production 2-ethylhexyl sulfate, a wetting agent used in the mercerisation of cotton, by combining sulfamic acid with 2-ethylhexanol.

== Applications ==
Sulfamic acid is mainly a precursor to sweet-tasting compounds. Reaction with cyclohexylamine followed by addition of NaOH gives C_{6}H_{11}NHSO_{3}Na, sodium cyclamate. Related compounds are also sweeteners, such as acesulfame potassium.

Sulfamates have been used in the design of many types of therapeutic agents such as antibiotics, nucleoside/nucleotide human immunodeficiency virus (HIV) reverse transcriptase inhibitors, HIV protease inhibitors (PIs), anticancer drugs (steroid sulfatase and carbonic anhydrase inhibitors), anti-epileptic drugs, and weight loss drugs.

=== Cleaning agent ===
Sulfamic acid is used as an acidic cleaning agent and descaling agent, either pure or as a component of proprietary mixtures, typically for metals and ceramics. For cleaning purposes, there are different grades based on application such as GP grade, SR grade and TM grade. It is frequently used for removing rust and limescale, replacing the more volatile and irritating hydrochloric acid, which is cheaper. It is often a component of household descalant, for example, Lime-A-Way Thick Gel contains up to 8% sulfamic acid and has pH 2.0–2.2, or detergents used for removal of limescale. When compared to most of the common strong mineral acids, sulfamic acid has desirable water descaling properties, low volatility, and low toxicity. It forms water-soluble salts of calcium, nickel, and ferric iron.

Sulfamic acid is preferable to hydrochloric acid in household use, due to its intrinsic safety. If inadvertently mixed with hypochlorite-based products, such as bleach, it does not form chlorine gas, whereas the most common acids would; the reaction (neutralisation) with ammonia produces a salt, as depicted in the section above.

It also finds applications in the industrial cleaning of dairy and brewhouse equipment. Although it is considered less corrosive than hydrochloric acid, corrosion inhibitors are often added to the commercial cleansers of which it is a component. It can be used as a descalant for descaling home coffee and espresso machines and in denture cleaners.

=== Other uses ===
- Catalyst for esterification process
- Dye and pigment manufacturing
- Herbicide, as ammonium sulfamate
- Descalant for scale removal
- Coagulator for urea-formaldehyde resins
- Ingredient in fire extinguishing media. Sulfamic acid is the main raw material for ammonium sulfamate, which is a widely used herbicide and fire-retardant material for household products.
- Pulp and paper industry, as a chloride stabilizer
- Synthesis of nitrous oxide by reaction with nitric acid
- The deprotonated form (sulfamate) is a common counterion for nickel(II) in electroplating.
- Used to separate nitrite ions from mixture of nitrite and nitrate ions (NO_{3}^{−} + NO_{2}^{−}) during qualitative analysis of nitrate by brown ring test.
- Obtaining deep eutectic solvents with urea
- As a treatment for removal of nitrite (NO_{2}^{−}) interference in Cyanide analysis.

=== Silver polishing ===
According to the label on the consumer product, the silver cleaning product Tarn-X contains thiourea, a detergent, and sulfamic acid.
