= Steroid sulfatase =

Protein-coding gene in the species Homo sapiens

STS
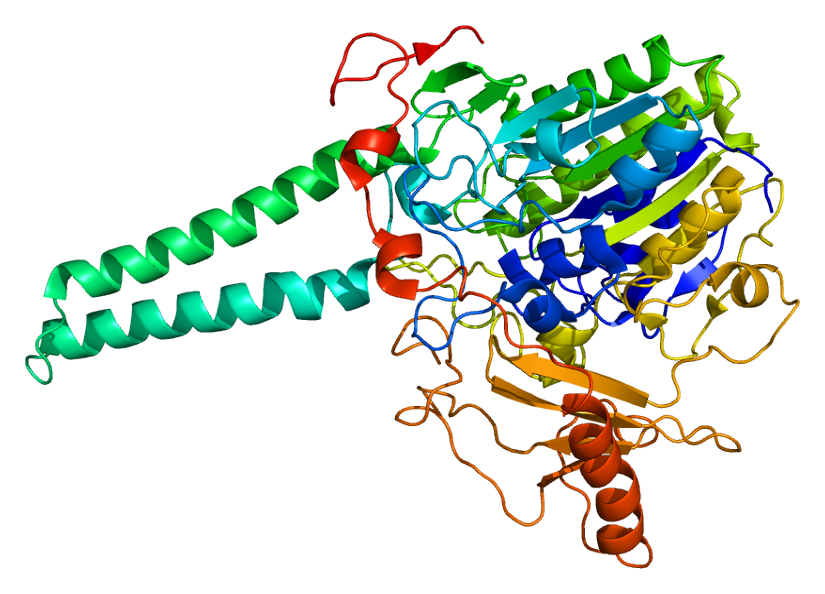

Identifiers
- Aliases: STS, ARSC, ARSC2, ARSC1, ASC, ES, SSDD, XLI, Steroid sulfatase (microsomal), isozyme S, steroid sulfatase
- External IDs: OMIM: 300747; GeneCards: STS
Available structures
PDB	Human UniProt search: PDBe RCSB
PDB	List of PDB id codes 1P49
Enzyme activity
EC #	BRENDA	ExPASy	KEGG	MetaCyc
3.1.6.2	↗	↗	↗	↗

Gene location (Human)
Chr.	X chromosome (human)
Band	Xp22.31	Start	7,147,237 bp
Band	Xp22.31	End	7,804,358 bp
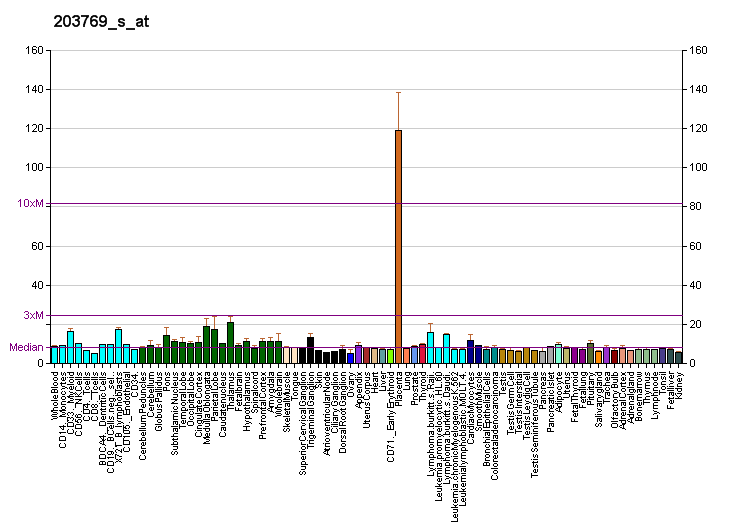

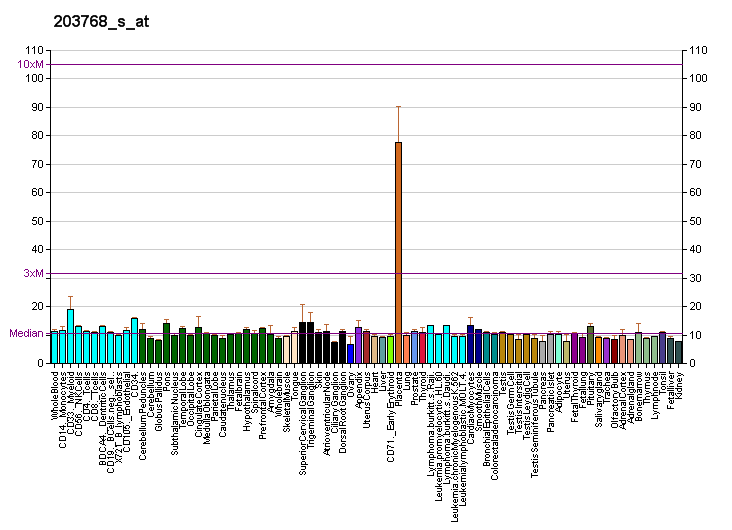

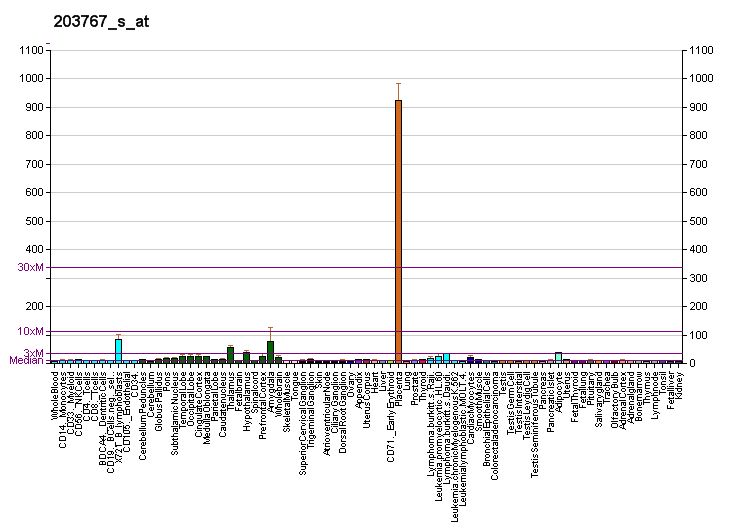
RNA expression pattern
Bgee	Human / Mouse (ortholog); Top expressed in: placenta; endothelial cell; palpebral conjunctiva; Brodmann area 23; pancreatic ductal cell; decidua; lateral nuclear group of thalamus; middle temporal gyrus; primary visual cortex; Brodmann area 46 / n/a; More reference expression data
BioGPS	More reference expression data
Gene ontology
Molecular function	metal ion binding; catalytic activity; steryl-sulfatase activity; sulfuric ester hydrolase activity; hydrolase activity; arylsulfatase activity
Cellular component	integral component of membrane; endosome; Golgi apparatus; endoplasmic reticulum lumen; membrane; endoplasmic reticulum membrane; plasma membrane; endoplasmic reticulum; lysosome; intracellular membrane-bounded organelle
Biological process	steroid metabolic process; glycosphingolipid metabolic process; lipid metabolism; female pregnancy; steroid catabolic process; epidermis development; metabolism
Sources:Amigo / QuickGO
Orthologs
Databases	NCBI: entry; OMA: entry
Species	Human	Mouse
Entrez	412	n/a
Ensembl	ENSG00000101846	n/a
UniProt	P08842	n/a
RefSeq (mRNA)	NM_000351; NM_001320750; NM_001320751; NM_001320752; NM_001320753 NM_001320754	n/a
RefSeq (protein)	NP_000342; NP_001307679; NP_001307680; NP_001307681; NP_001307682 NP_001307683	n/a
Location (UCSC)	Chr X: 7.15 – 7.8 Mb	n/a
PubMed search		n/a
- Wikidata
View/Edit Human

Steryl-sulfatase

Identifiers
- EC no.: 3.1.6.2
- CAS no.: 9025-62-1

Databases
- BRENDA: enzyme data
- ExPASy: NiceZyme view
- KEGG: enzyme entry
- MetaCyc: metabolic pathway
- Rhea: reactions
- PDB structures: RCSB PDB PDBe PDBsum
Search
- PMC: articles
- PubMed: articles
- NCBI: proteins

Steroid sulfatase (STS), or steryl-sulfatase (EC 3.1.6.2), formerly known as arylsulfatase C, is a sulfatase enzyme involved in the metabolism of steroids. It is encoded by the STS gene.

== Reactions ==
This enzyme catalyses the following chemical reaction

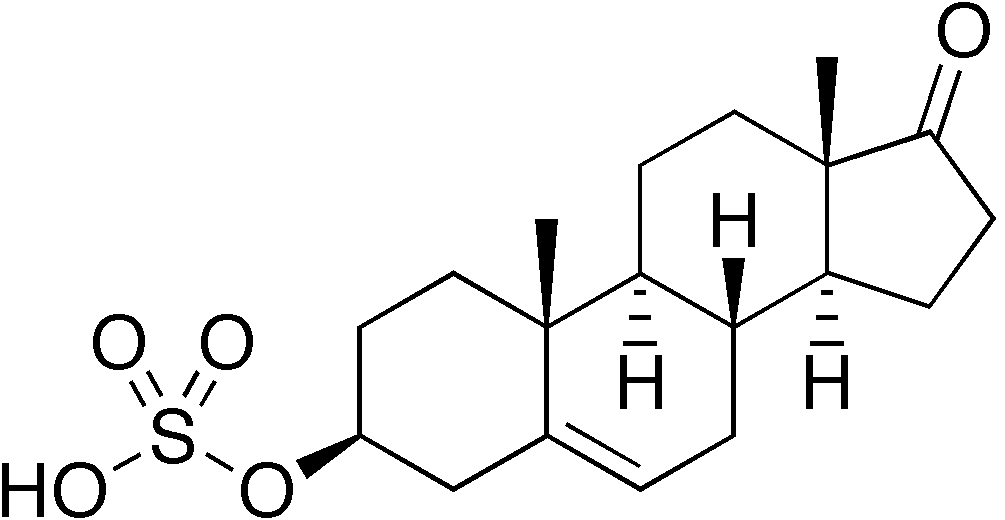
dehydroepiandrosterone sulfate
H_{2}O
H_{2}SO_{4}
dehydroepiandrosterone

It also acts on some related steryl sulfates.

== Function ==
The protein encoded by this gene catalyzes the conversion of sulfated steroid precursors to the free steroid. This includes DHEA sulfate, estrone sulfate, pregnenolone sulfate, and cholesterol sulfate, all to their unconjugated forms (DHEA, estrone, pregnenolone, and cholesterol, respectively). The encoded protein is found in the endoplasmic reticulum, where it is present as a homodimer.

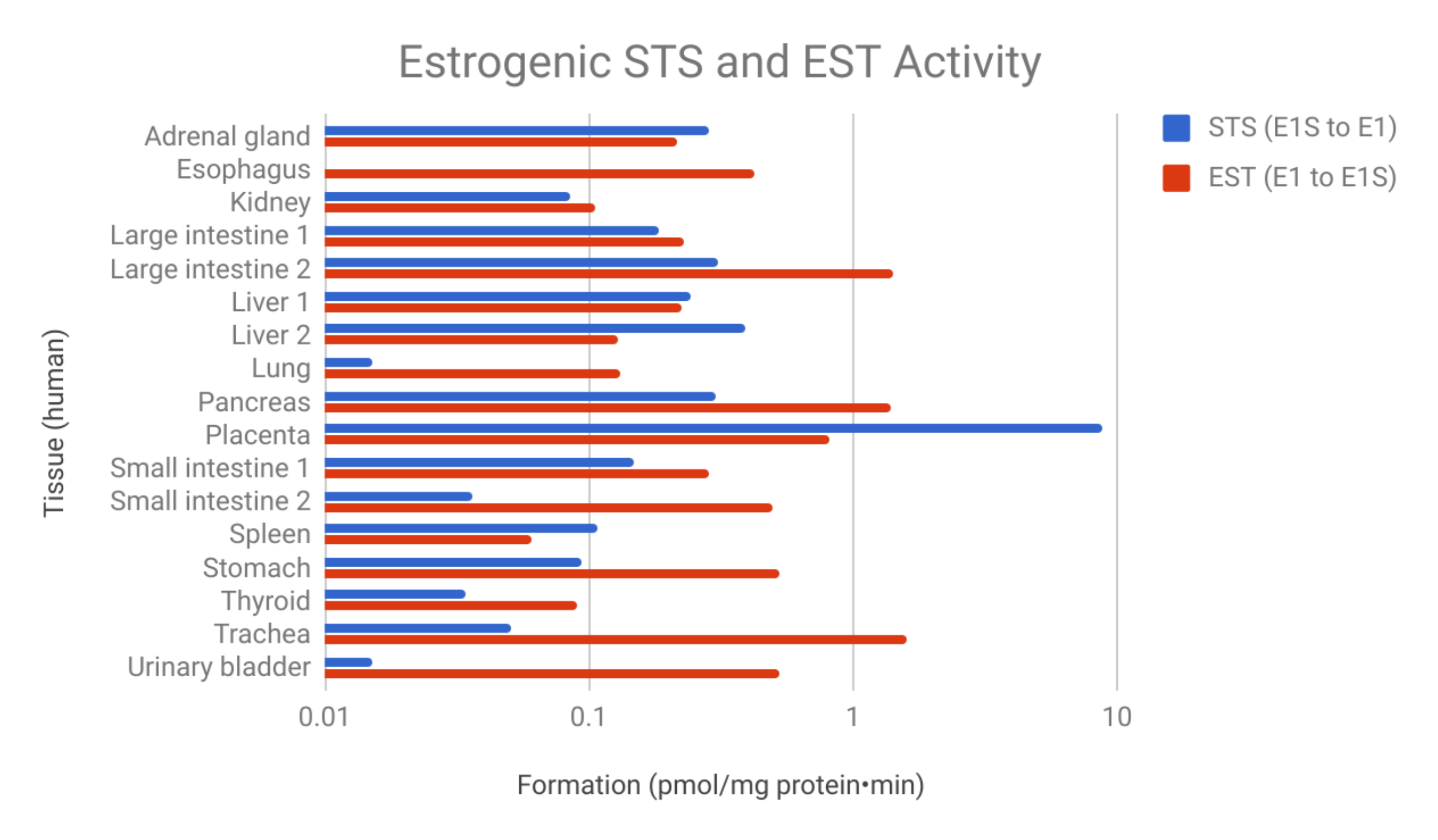
Distribution of STS and EST activities for interconversion of estrone (E1) and estrone sulfate (E1S) in adult human tissues.

== Clinical significance ==
A congenital deficiency in the enzyme is associated with X-linked ichthyosis, a scaly-skin disease affecting roughly 1 in every 2,000 to 6,000 males. The excessive skin scaling and hyperkeratosis is caused by a lack of breakdown and thus accumulation of cholesterol sulfate, a steroid that stabilizes cell membranes and adds cohesion, in the outer layers of the skin.

Genetic deletions including STS are associated with an increased risk of developmental and mood disorders (and associated traits), and of atrial fibrillation or atrial flutter in males. Both steroid sulfatase deficiency and common genetic risk variants within STS may confer increased atrial fibrillation risk. Cardiac arrhythmia in STS deficiency may be related to abnormal development of the interventricular septum or interatrial septum. Blood-clotting abnormalities may occur more frequently in males with XLI and female carriers. Knockdown of STS gene expression in human skin cell cultures affects pathways associated with skin function, brain and heart development, and blood-clotting that may be relevant for explaining the skin condition and increased likelihood of ADHD/autism, cardiac arrhythmias and disorders of hemostasis in XLI.

Steroid sulfates like DHEA sulfate and estrone sulfate serve as large biologically inert reservoirs for conversion into androgens and estrogens, respectively, and hence are of significance for androgen- and estrogen-dependent conditions like prostate cancer, breast cancer, endometriosis, and others. A number of clinical trials have been performed with inhibitors of the enzyme that have demonstrated clinical benefit, particularly in oncology and so far up to Phase II. The non-steroidal drug Irosustat has been the most studied to date.

== Inhibitors ==
Inhibitors of STS include irosustat, estrone sulfamate (EMATE), estradiol sulfamate (E2MATE), and danazol. The most potent inhibitors are based around the aryl sulfamate pharmacophore and it is thought that such compounds irreversibly modify the active site formylglycine residue of steroid sulfatase.

== Names ==
Steryl-sulfatase is also known as arylsulfatase, steroid sulfatase, sterol sulfatase, dehydroepiandrosterone sulfate sulfatase, arylsulfatase C, steroid 3-sulfatase, steroid sulfate sulfohydrolase, dehydroepiandrosterone sulfatase, pregnenolone sulfatase, phenolic steroid sulfatase, 3-beta-hydroxysteroid sulfate sulfatase, as well as by its systematic name steryl-sulfate sulfohydrolase.

== See also ==
- Steroidogenic enzyme
- Steroid sulfotransferase
- Estrogen sulfotransferase
