= CYP11A2 =

Protein-coding gene in the species Danio rerio

cytochrome P450, family 11, subfamily a, polypeptide 2

Identifiers
- Organism: Danio rerio
- Symbol: CYP11A2
- Entrez: 563363
- Orthologs: NCBI: entry; OMA: entry
- RefSeq (mRNA): XM_686725.7
- RefSeq (Prot): XP_691817.1
- UniProt: F1R1K0

Other data
- EC number: 1.14.15.6
- Chromosome: 25: 22.3 - 22.31 Mb
Search for
- Structures: Swiss-model
- Domains: InterPro

The Cyp11a2 is a fish gene encoding a CYP450 monooxygenase, which was originally identified in Zebrafish (Danio rerio), is the isozyme and paralogous of fish CYP11A1, catalyzes conversion of cholesterol to pregnenolone.
