= Cholesterol sulfate =

Names
- IUPAC name [(3S,8S,9S,10R,13R,14S,17R)-10,13-Dimethyl-17-[(2R)-6-methylheptan-2-yl]-2,3,4,7,8,9,11,12,14,15,16,17-dodecahydro-1H-cyclopenta[a]phenanthren-3-yl] hydrogen sulfate
- Other names Cholest-5-en-3β-ol sulfate

Identifiers
CAS Number	1256-86-6
3D model (JSmol)	Interactive image
ChEBI	CHEBI:41321
ChEMBL	ChEMBL1231592
ChemSpider	58586
PubChem CID	65076
UNII	KU576NT9O9
- InChI: InChI=1S/C27H46O4S/c1-18(2)7-6-8-19(3)23-11-12-24-22-10-9-20-17-21(31-32(28,29)30)13-15-26(20,4)25(22)14-16-27(23,24)5/h9,18-19,21-25H,6-8,10-17H2,1-5H3,(H,28,29,30)/t19-,21+,22+,23-,24+,25+,26+,27-/m1/s1 Key: BHYOQNUELFTYRT-DPAQBDIFSA-N; InChI=1/C27H46O4S/c1-18(2)7-6-8-19(3)23-11-12-24-22-10-9-20-17-21(31-32(28,29)30)13-15-26(20,4)25(22)14-16-27(23,24)5/h9,18-19,21-25H,6-8,10-17H2,1-5H3,(H,28,29,30)/t19-,21+,22+,23-,24+,25+,26+,27-/m1/s1 Key: BHYOQNUELFTYRT-DPAQBDIFBL
- SMILES: C[C@H](CCCC(C)C)[C@H]1CC[C@@H]2[C@@]1(CC[C@H]3[C@H]2CC=C4[C@@]3(CC[C@@H](C4)OS(=O)(=O)O)C)C

Properties
Chemical formula	C_{27}H_{46}O_{4}S
Molar mass	466.72 g·mol^{−1}
- Except where otherwise noted, data are given for materials in their standard state (at 25 °C [77 °F], 100 kPa). Infobox references

Cholesterol sulfate, or cholest-5-en-3β-ol sulfate, is an endogenous steroid and the C3β sulfate ester of cholesterol. It is formed from cholesterol by steroid sulfotransferases (SSTs) such as SULT2B1b (also known as cholesterol sulfotransferase) and is converted back into cholesterol by steroid sulfatase (STS). Accumulation of cholesterol sulfate in the skin is implicated in the pathophysiology of X-linked ichthyosis, a congenital disorder in which STS is non-functional and the body cannot convert cholesterol sulfate back into cholesterol.

== See also ==
- Steroid sulfate
