= Androsterone sulfate =

Names
- IUPAC name 17-Oxo-5α-androstan-7α-yl hydrogen sulfate
- Systematic IUPAC name (3aS,3bR,5aS,9aS,9bS,11aS)-9a,11a-Dimethyl-1-oxohexadecahydro-1H-cyclopenta[a]phenanthren-7-yl hydrogen sulfate
- Other names 3α-Hydroxy-5α-androstan-17-one 3-sulfate; 5α-Androstane-3α-ol-17-one 3-sulfate

Identifiers
CAS Number	2479-86-9
3D model (JSmol)	Interactive image
ChEBI	CHEBI:83037
ChEMBL	ChEMBL2074598
ChemSpider	140383
PubChem CID	159663
UNII	UK5M12Z93J
CompTox Dashboard (EPA)	DTXSID401315288
- InChI: InChI=1S/C19H30O5S/c1-18-9-7-13(24-25(21,22)23)11-12(18)3-4-14-15-5-6-17(20)19(15,2)10-8-16(14)18/h12-16H,3-11H2,1-2H3,(H,21,22,23)/t12-,13+,14-,15-,16-,18-,19-/m0/s1 Key: ZMITXKRGXGRMKS-HLUDHZFRSA-N
- SMILES: C[C@]12CC[C@H](C[C@@H]1CC[C@@H]3[C@@H]2CC[C@]4([C@H]3CCC4=O)C)OS(=O)(=O)O

Properties
Chemical formula	C_{19}H_{30}O_{5}S
Molar mass	370.50 g·mol^{−1}
- Except where otherwise noted, data are given for materials in their standard state (at 25 °C [77 °F], 100 kPa). Infobox references

Androsterone sulfate, also known as 3α-hydroxy-5α-androstan-17-one 3α-sulfate, is an endogenous, naturally occurring steroid and one of the major urinary metabolites of androgens. It is a steroid sulfate which is formed from sulfation of androsterone by the steroid sulfotransferase SULT2A1 and can be desulfated back into androsterone by steroid sulfatase.

== See also ==
- Androsterone glucuronide
- Steroid sulfate
- C_{19}H_{30}O_{5}S
