= X-linked ichthyosis =

- Other names: Steroid sulfatase deficiency, X-linked recessive ichthyosis
- X-linked recessive inheritance: Affected boys may inherit a deletion or mutation of the STS gene from their mothers
- Specialty: Medical genetics

X-linked ichthyosis (abbreviated XLI) is a skin condition caused by the hereditary deficiency of the steroid sulfatase (STS) enzyme that affects 1 in 2000 to 1 in 6000 males. XLI manifests with dry, scaly skin and is due to deletions or mutations in the STS gene. XLI can also occur in the context of larger deletions causing contiguous gene syndromes. Treatment is largely aimed at alleviating the skin symptoms. The term is from the Ancient Greek 'ichthys' meaning 'fish'.

== Signs and symptoms ==
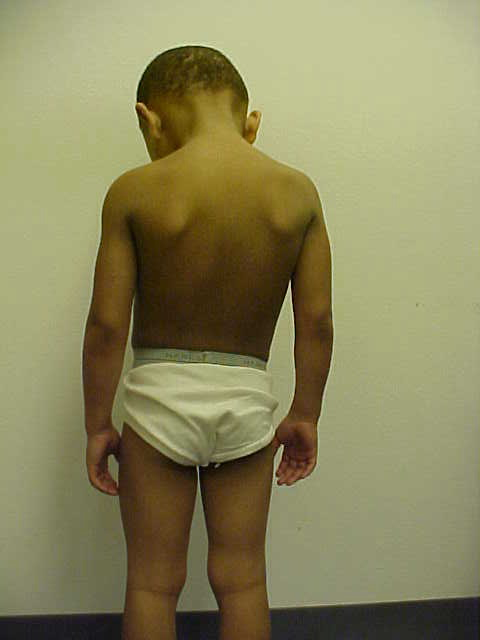
X linked ichthyosis

The major symptoms of XLI include scaling of the skin, particularly on the neck, trunk, and lower extremities. The extensor surfaces are typically the most severely affected areas. The >4 mm diameter scales adhere to the underlying skin and can be dark brown or gray in color. Symptoms may subside during the summer.

=== Associated medical conditions ===
Aside from the skin scaling, XLI is not typically associated with other major medical problems. Atrial fibrillation or atrial flutter may affect up to 1 in 10 males with XLI. Heart rhythm abnormalities in individuals with XLI tend to co-occur with disorders of the gastrointestinal tract, and are likely to result from steroid sulfatase deficiency. Cardiac arrhythmia in XLI may be related to abnormal development of the interventricular septum or interatrial septum. Corneal opacities may be present but do not affect vision. Cryptorchidism is reported in some individuals. Individuals with XLI appear at increased risk of neurodevelopmental disorders such as autism and attention deficit hyperactivity disorder and some affected individuals exhibit mood problems Mood problems in XLI appear to be most influenced by stigma or bullying associated with the skin condition, and by difficulties with treating the skin condition. XLI is associated with mild-moderate impairments in memory which appear to be independent of effects on mood. Blood-clotting abnormalities may occur more frequently in males with XLI and female carriers. Individuals with XLI can exhibit intellectual disability, although this is thought to be due to deletions encompassing neighboring genes (e.g. VCX) in addition to STS. The skin and medical conditions associated with XLI are likely to be due to perturbed basement membrane function and abnormal interactions with the extracellular matrix. Knockdown of STS gene expression in human skin cell cultures affects pathways associated with skin function, brain and heart development, and blood-clotting that may be relevant for explaining the skin condition and increased likelihood of ADHD/autism, cardiac arrhythmias and disorders of hemostasis in XLI

Female carriers generally do not experience any of these problems but can have difficulty during childbirth, as the STS expressed in the placenta plays a role in normal labor. Female carriers may also be at slightly increased risk of developing mental health problems following childbirth For these reasons carriers should ensure their obstetrician is aware of the condition.

== Genetics ==
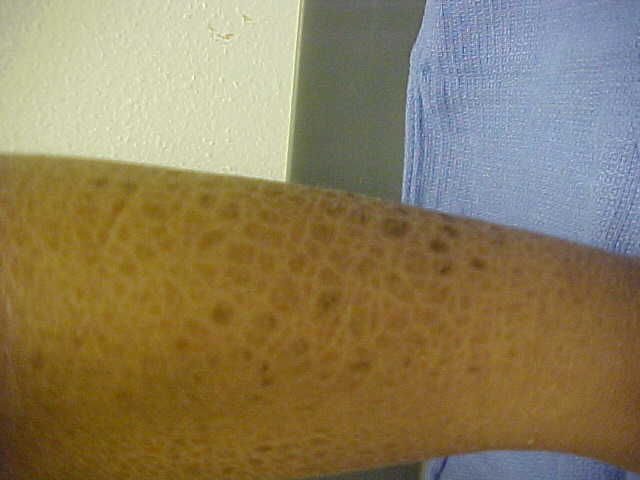
X linked ichthyosis - this boy has an infant brother and maternal uncle with the same condition

The STS gene is located on the X chromosome at band Xp22.3. Thus, the syndrome is an X-linked condition, and it affects males and females differently. The 23rd pair of chromosomes is typically termed the "sex chromosomes". Females have two X chromosomes and males have one X and one Y chromosome. Therefore, in normal individuals, males carry a single copy of the STS gene and females carry two copies. This gene partially escapes X-inactivation and females normally express higher amounts of the STS enzyme than males.

XLI can occur through new deletions or mutations of the STS gene but is more commonly inherited from a carrier mother. A hemizygous deletion or mutation of the STS gene in a male results in complete absence of enzyme activity, while a female carrier of a mutation or deletion is heterozygous and still has a normal copy of the STS gene. Female carriers of an STS deletion or mutation still express the STS enzyme, although with decreased enzyme activity.

For this reason, XLI most commonly affects males, although individuals with numeric abnormalities of the sex chromosomes (45,X and 47,XXY) who also carry STS deletions or mutations would be exceptions to this rule.

In addition, a female could be affected if she were the offspring of an affected male and a carrier female and inherited a deletion or mutation of the STS gene on both X chromosomes.

=== Genetic counseling issues ===
Since the majority of cases appear to occur through transmission of an STS deletion from a carrier mother, enzyme testing or DNA testing should be performed in the mother of any newly diagnosed simplex case (i.e. the first case in a family). In the case of an extended family with many affected individuals, carrier status can often be assigned based on pedigree analysis.

- Males with XLI will transmit the X chromosome harboring the STS deletion or mutation to each of his female offspring, who will therefore be an obligate carrier. However, all male offspring will be unaffected, since they receive their father's Y chromosome.
- Female carriers of an STS deletion or mutation have a 50% chance with each pregnancy of transmitting it to an offspring. Thus, each male offspring has a 50% chance of being affected by XLI, while each female offspring has a 50% chance of being a carrier for this condition. Any individual that inherits the mother's normal copy of the STS gene will be unaffected and will have an extremely low chance of having a child affected with this condition.

Due to random segregation of the chromosomes during gametogenesis, each pregnancy will be subject to the same probabilities, regardless of the number of previously affected or unaffected offspring. The above recurrence risks are based on the assumption that an affected male or carrier female will have children with an unaffected or non-carrier individual. The risks of having affected offspring would clearly increase in the case of a union between a male with XLI and a carrier female.

=== Physiology/biochemistry ===
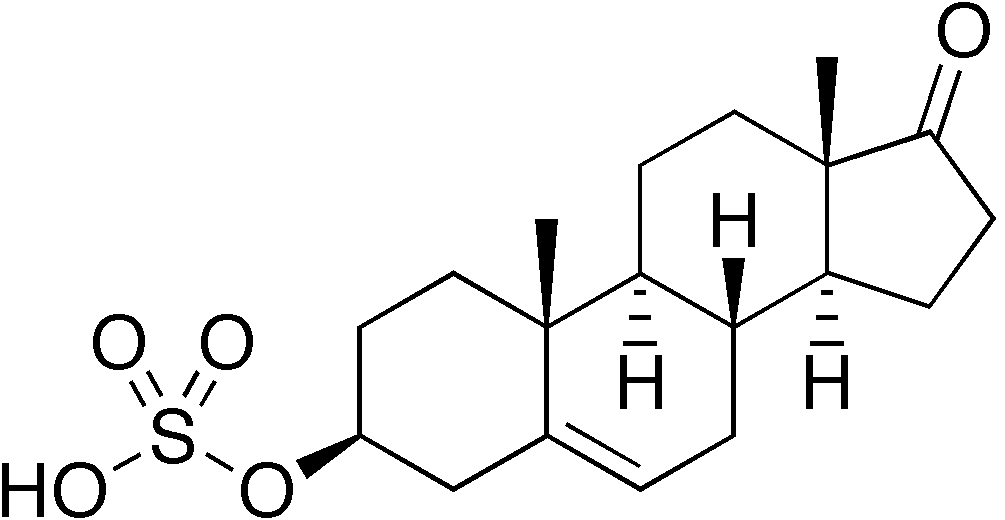
DHEA sulfate

The STS enzyme (EC 3.1.6.2), also referred to as Arylsulfatase C, is expressed throughout the body, with highest expression in the skin, liver, lymph nodes, and placenta, and lower expression in breast tissue and brain STS catalyzes the hydrolysis of sulfated steroids, such as estrone sulfate and dehydroepiandrosterone sulfate (DHEAS), to non-sulfated steroids estradiol and androstenediol, respectively. Prenatally, the enzyme is involved in placental estrogen production. The enzyme is also involved in adrenal steroid production as well as conversion of sulfated steroids in other tissues.

There seems to be a particularly important role for the enzyme in skin. Deficiency of the enzyme leads to the characteristic dry and scaly skin seen in ichthyosis. Recent research indicates that the skin abnormalities seen in XLI may be due to accumulation of cholesterol sulfate in the outer epidermis, leading to abnormal barrier function and corneocyte retention.

== Diagnosis ==
XLI can be suspected based on clinical findings, although symptoms can take varying amounts of time to become evident, from a few hours after birth, up to a year in milder cases. The diagnosis is usually made by a dermatologist, who also typically formulates the treatment plan (see below). STS enzyme deficiency is confirmed using a clinically available biochemical assay. Carrier detection can be performed in mothers of affected sons using this test (see Genetics, below). Molecular testing for DNA deletions or mutations is also offered, and can be particularly useful in the evaluation of individuals with associated medical conditions (see below). Prenatal diagnosis is possible using either biochemical or molecular tests. However, the use of prenatal diagnosis for genetic conditions that are considered to be generally benign raises serious ethical considerations and requires detailed genetic counseling.

== Treatment ==
Because XLI is caused by a gene mutation or deletion, there is no "cure." One of the aims of treatment is to reduce scaling by removing the excess, flaky scales, and keep the skin hydrated. This can be achieved using a variety of topical creams. Other treatments involve

- Keratolytic agents such as Ammonium lactate (Lac-Hydrin) are used to facilitate the release of retained corneocytes.
- oral isotretinoin
- acitretin
- The topical receptor-selective retinoid tazarotene

Research is ongoing with regard to the use of gene therapy to treat XLI. Timber Pharmaceuticals is planning on conducting a phase 3 trial of its investigational topical isotretinoin product in the second quarter of 2022 for the treatment of congenital ichthyosis.

== History ==
In the 1960s, recessive x-linked ichthyosis was distinguished clinically from other ichthyoses.

== See also ==
- Ichthyosis
- Carvajal syndrome
