= Dehydroepiandrosterone sulfate =

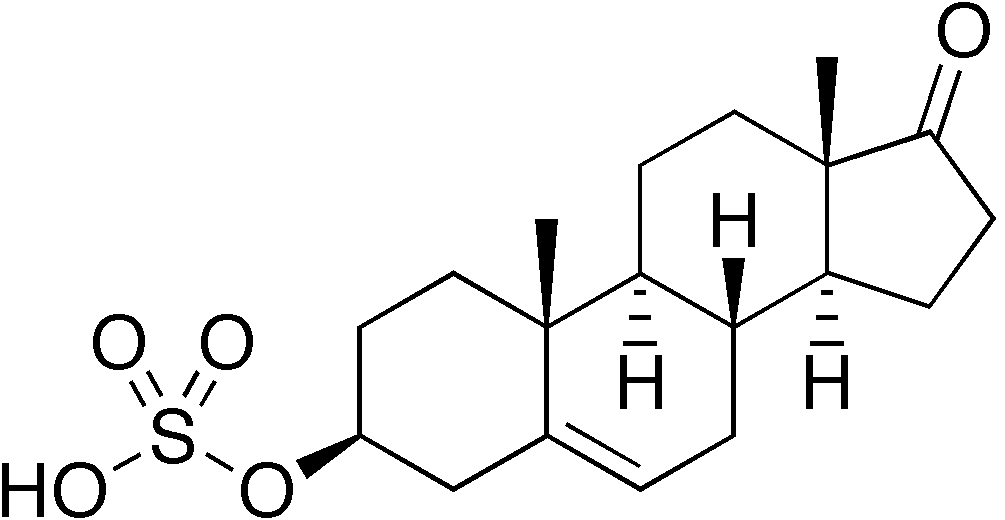

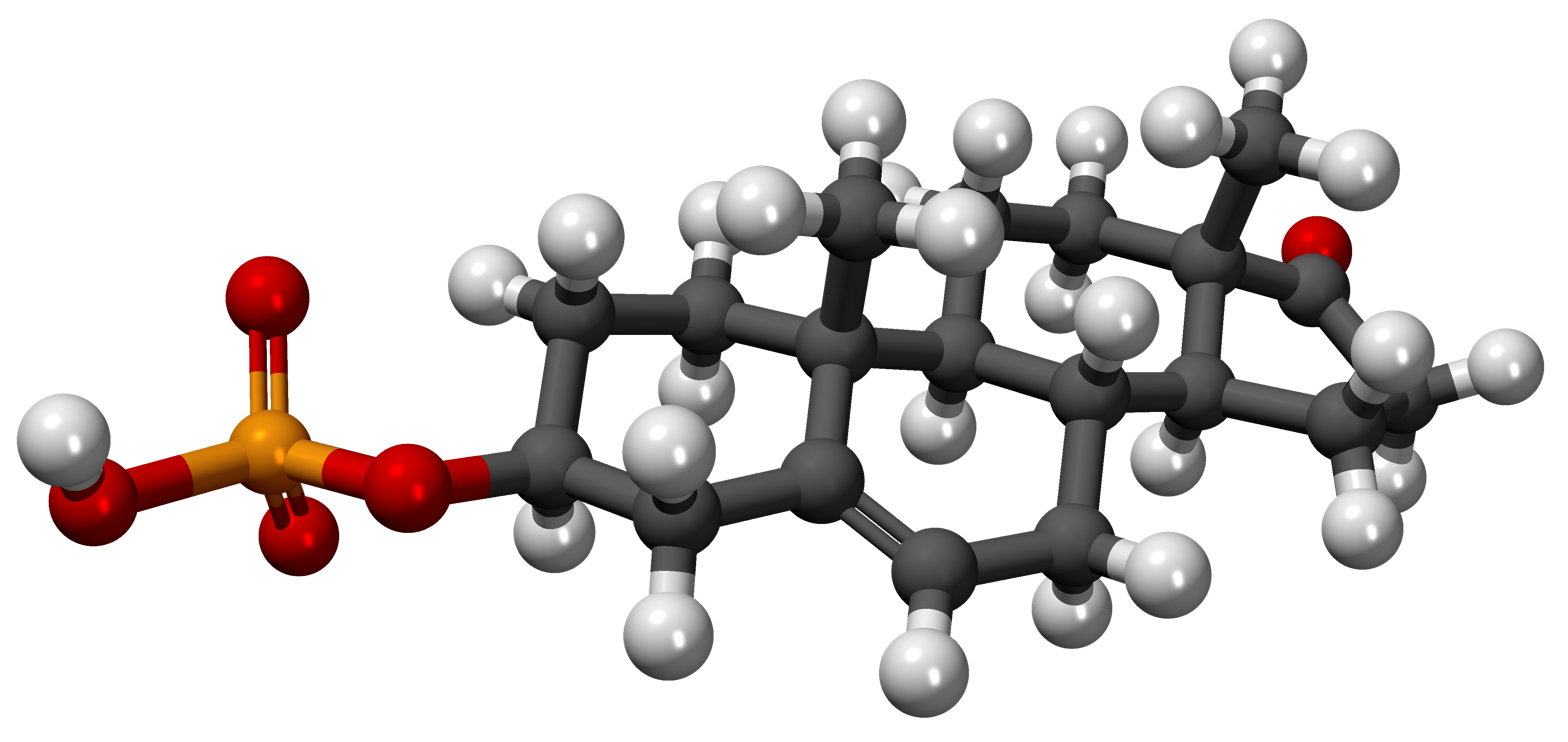

Names
- IUPAC name 17-Oxoandrost-5-en-3β-yl hydrogen sulfate
- Systematic IUPAC name (3aS,3bR,7S,9aR,9bS,11aS)-9a,11a-Dimethyl-1-oxo-2,3,3a,3b,4,6,7,8,9,9a,9b,10,11,11a-tetradecahydro-1H-cyclopenta[a]phenanthren-7-yl hydrogen sulfate
- Other names Androstenolone sulfate; Prasterone sulfate; Androst-5-en-3β-ol-17-one 3β-sulfate

Identifiers
CAS Number	651-48-9
3D model (JSmol)	Interactive image
Abbreviations	DHEA sulfate; DHEA-S; DHEAS
ChemSpider	12074
PubChem CID	12594
UNII	57B09Q7FJR
CompTox Dashboard (EPA)	DTXSID8040228
- InChI: InChI=1S/C19H28O5S/c1-18-9-7-13(24-25(21,22)23)11-12(18)3-4-14-15-5-6-17(20)19(15,2)10-8-16(14)18/h3,13-16H,4-11H2,1-2H3,(H,21,22,23)/t13-,14-,15-,16-,18-,19-/m0/s1 Key: CZWCKYRVOZZJNM-USOAJAOKSA-N; InChI=1/C19H28O5S/c1-18-9-7-13(24-25(21,22)23)11-12(18)3-4-14-15-5-6-17(20)19(15,2)10-8-16(14)18/h3,13-16H,4-11H2,1-2H3,(H,21,22,23)/t13-,14-,15-,16-,18-,19-/m0/s1 Key: CZWCKYRVOZZJNM-USOAJAOKBK
- SMILES: C[C@]12CC[C@H]3[C@H]([C@@H]1CCC2=O)CC=C4[C@@]3(CC[C@@H](C4)OS(=O)(=O)O)C

Properties
Chemical formula	C_{19}H_{28}O_{5}S
Molar mass	368.49 g/mol
- Except where otherwise noted, data are given for materials in their standard state (at 25 °C [77 °F], 100 kPa). verify (what is ?) Infobox references

Dehydroepiandrosterone sulfate, abbreviated as DHEA sulfate or DHEA-S, also known as androstenolone sulfate, is an endogenous androstane steroid that is produced by the adrenal cortex. It is the 3β-sulfate ester and a metabolite of dehydroepiandrosterone (DHEA) and circulates in far greater relative concentrations than DHEA. DHEA-S is inert as a nuclear steroid hormone, but is an important neurosteroid and neurotrophin.

== Biological activity ==
=== Neurosteroid activity ===
Sulfated steroids such as DHEA-S have poor affinity for the steroid hormone receptors. However, DHEA-S retains strong activity as a neurosteroid. It has been found to act as a positive allosteric modulator of the NMDA receptor (50 nM–1 μM), negative allosteric modulator of the GABA_{A} and glycine receptors, and weak agonist of the sigma-1 receptor (K_{d} > 50 μM). In addition, DHEA-S has been found to directly bind to and activate the TrkA and p75^{NTR} – receptors of neurotrophins like nerve growth factor (NGF) and brain-derived neurotrophic factor (BDNF) – with high affinity (around 5 nM).

=== Hormonal activity ===
Although DHEA-S itself is hormonally inert, it has been thought that it can be converted back into DHEA, which is weakly androgenic and estrogenic, and that DHEA in turn can be transformed into more potent androgens like testosterone and dihydrotestosterone (DHT) as well as estrogens like estradiol. As such, it has been thought that DHEA-S is a prohormone with the potential for androgenic and estrogenic effects. However, a 2005 study found that DHEA could be converted into DHEA-S but found no evidence that the conversion of DHEA-S into DHEA was significant in adults (outside of pregnancy).

=== Other activity ===
DHEA-S has also been found to inhibit the TRPV1 and TRPC5 transient receptor potential channels and to inhibit the P2X receptor.

== Biochemistry ==
Comprehensive overview of steroidogenesis, showing DHEA, the precursor of DHEA-S, at left among the androgens.

=== Biosynthesis ===
DHEA and DHEA-S are produced in the zona reticularis of the adrenal cortex under the control of adrenocorticotropic hormone (ACTH). DHEA is synthesized from cholesterol via the enzymes cholesterol side-chain cleavage enzyme (CYP11A1; P450scc) and 17α-hydroxylase/17,20-lyase (CYP17A1), with pregnenolone and 17α-hydroxypregnenolone as intermediates. Then, DHEA-S is formed by sulfation of DHEA at the C3β position via the sulfotransferase enzymes SULT2A1 and to a lesser extent SULT1E1. Whereas DHEA is derived mostly from the adrenal cortex but is also secreted to a lesser extent by the gonads (10%), DHEA-S is almost exclusively produced and secreted by the adrenal cortex, with 95 to 100% originating from the adrenal cortex in women. Approximately 10 to 15 mg of DHEA-S is secreted by the adrenal cortex per day in young adults.

=== Distribution ===
Unlike DHEA, which is weakly bound to albumin, DHEA-S is strongly bound to albumin (i.e., with very high affinity), and this is the reason for its much longer comparative terminal half-life. In contrast to DHEA, DHEA-S is not bound to any extent to sex hormone-binding globulin (SHBG).

Whereas DHEA easily crosses the blood–brain barrier into the central nervous system, DHEA-S poorly crosses the blood–brain barrier.

=== Metabolism ===
DHEA-S can be converted back into DHEA via steroid sulfatase (STS). In premenopausal women, 40 to 75% of circulating testosterone is derived from peripheral metabolism of DHEA-S, and in postmenopausal women, over 90% of estrogens, mainly estrone, are derived from peripheral metabolism of DHEA-S. A study found that administration of exogenous DHEA-S in women who were pregnant increased circulating levels of estrone and estradiol. DHEA-S serves as a depot for potent androgens like testosterone and dihydrotestosterone in prostate cancer, which fuel the growth of this cancer.

The elimination half-life of DHEA-S is 7 to 10 hours, which is far longer than that of DHEA, which has an elimination half-life of only 15 to 30 minutes.

=== Elimination ===
DHEA-S is excreted in the urine via the kidneys.

=== Levels ===
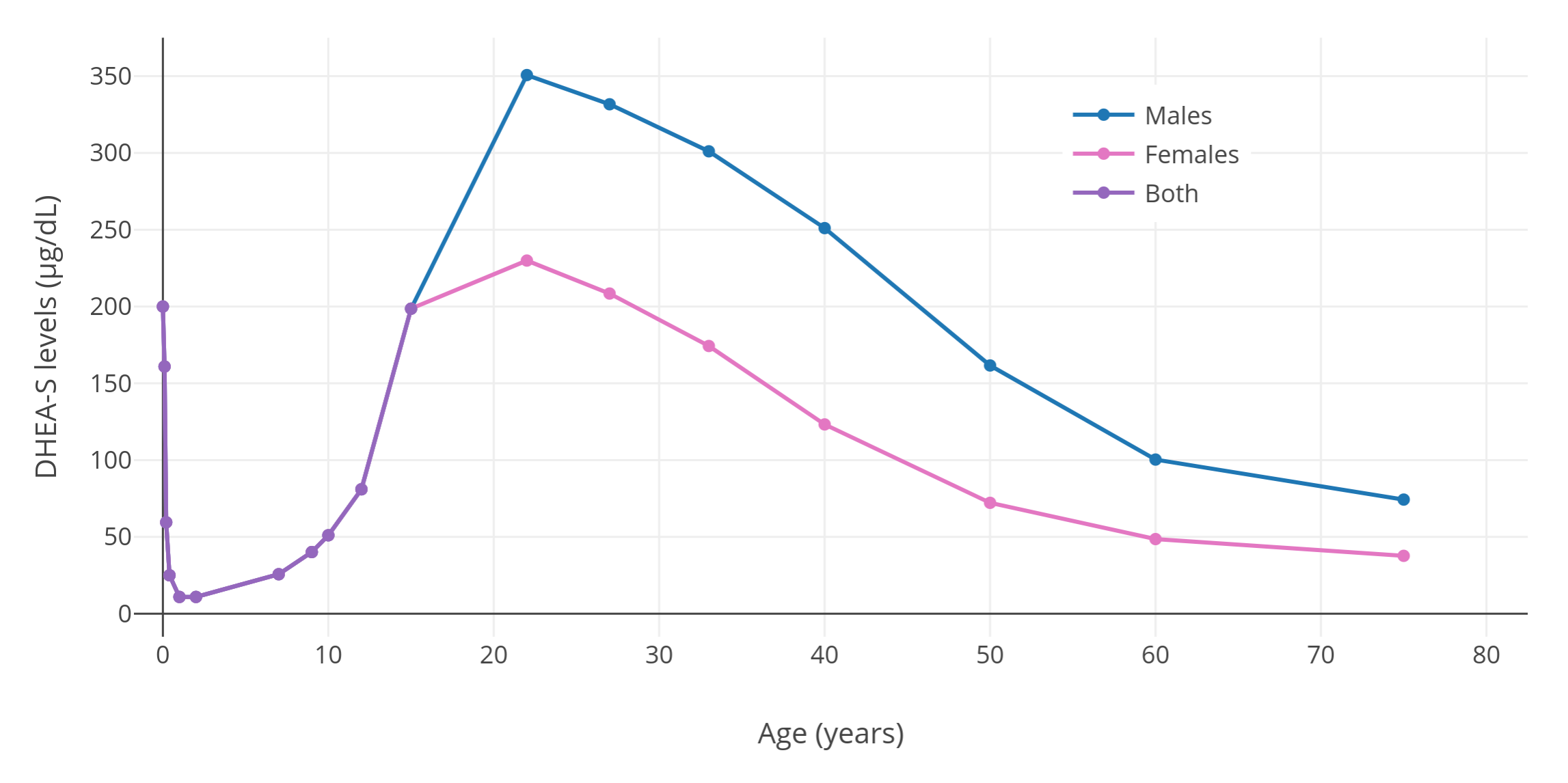
DHEA-S levels throughout life in humans.

DHEA and DHEA-S are the most abundant circulating steroids in the body. Plasma levels of DHEA-S are 100 or more times higher than those of DHEA, 5 to 10 times higher than those of cortisol, 100 to 500 times those of testosterone, and 1,000 to 10,000 times higher than those of estradiol.

Levels of DHEA and DHEA-S vary throughout life. They remain low during childhood until adrenarche around 6 to 8 years of age, at which point they markedly increase, eventually peaking at around 20 to 30 years of age. From the third decade of life on, DHEA and DHEA-S levels gradually decrease. By the age of 70, levels of DHEA and DHEA-S are 80 to 85% lower than those of young adults, and in people more than 80 years of age, DHEA and DHEA-S levels can reach 80 to 90% lower than those of younger individuals.

DHEA-S levels are higher in men than in women.

==== Reference ranges ====
Reference ranges for DHEA-S in females
Tanner stage and average age		Lower limit	Upper limit	Unit
Tanner stage I	>14 days	16	96	μg/dL
Tanner stage II	10.5 years	22	184	μg/dL
Tanner stage III	11.6 years	<15	296	μg/dL
Tanner stage IV	12.3 years	17	343	μg/dL
Tanner stage V	14.5 years	44	332	μg/dL
18–29 years		44	332	μg/dL
30–39 years		31	228	μg/dL
40–49 years		18	244	μg/dL
50–59 years		<15	200	μg/dL
> or =60 years		<15	157	μg/dL

Reference ranges for DHEA-S in males
Tanner stage and average age		Lower limit	Upper limit	Unit
Tanner stage I	>14 days	<15	120	μg/dL
Tanner stage II	11.5 years	<15	333	μg/dL
Tanner stage III	13.6 years	<15	312	μg/dL
Tanner stage IV	15.1 years	29	412	μg/dL
Tanner stage V	18.0 years	89	457	μg/dL
18–29 years		89	457	μg/dL
30–39 years		65	334	μg/dL
40–49 years		48	244	μg/dL
50–59 years		35	179	μg/dL
> or =60 years		25	131	μg/dL

== Medical use ==
=== Deficiency ===
The Endocrine Society recommends against the therapeutic use of DHEA-S in both healthy women and those with adrenal insufficiency, as its role is not clear from studies performed so far. The routine use of DHEA-S and other androgens is discouraged in the treatment of women with low androgen levels due to hypopituitarism, adrenal insufficiency, menopause due to ovarian surgery, glucocorticoid use, or other conditions associated with low androgen levels; this is because there are limited data supporting improvement in signs and symptoms with therapy and no long-term studies of risk.

In otherwise elderly women, in whom an age-related fall of DHEA-S may be associated with menopausal symptoms and reduced libido, DHEA-S supplementation cannot currently be said to improve outcomes.

=== Childbirth ===
As the sodium salt, prasterone sodium sulfate, DHEA-S is used as a pharmaceutical drug in Japan in the treatment of insufficient cervical ripening and cervical dilation during childbirth.

== Diagnostic use ==
DHEA-S levels above 1890 μM or 700 to 800 μg/dL are highly suggestive of adrenal dysfunction because DHEA-S is made by the adrenal glands and also synthesized in the brain. The presence of DHEA-S is therefore used to rule out ovarian or testicular origin of excess androgen.

Women with hirsutism commonly present with mildly elevated DHEA-S levels. Common etiologies for hirsutism include ovarian dysfunction (e.g. polyendocrine metabolic ovarian syndrome (PMOS)) and adrenal dysfunction (congenital adrenal hyperplasia, Cushing's syndrome, androgen secreting tumors); 90% of these cases are caused by PMOS or are idiopathic in nature. However, severely increased DHEA-S levels (>700 μg/dL) necessitate further workup and almost always stem from benign or malignant adrenal alterations.

== Chemistry ==
DHEA-S, also known as androst-5-en-3β-ol-17-one 3β-sulfate, is a naturally occurring androstane steroid and the C3β sulfate ester of DHEA.
