= 3alpha-hydroxysteroid dehydrogenase (A-specific) =

Enzyme

3-alpha-hydroxysteroid dehydrogenase (A-specific)

Identifiers
- EC no.: 1.1.1.213

Databases
- IntEnz: IntEnz view
- BRENDA: BRENDA entry
- ExPASy: NiceZyme view
- KEGG: KEGG entry
- MetaCyc: metabolic pathway
- PRIAM: profile
- PDB structures: RCSB PDB PDBe PDBsum
- Gene Ontology: AmiGO / QuickGO
Search
- PMC: articles
- PubMed: articles
- NCBI: proteins

In enzymology, a 3alpha-hydroxysteroid dehydrogenase (A-specific) (EC 1.1.1.213) is an enzyme that catalyzes the chemical reaction

androsterone + NAD(P)^{+} $\rightleftharpoons$ 5alpha-androstane-3,17-dione + NAD(P)H + H^{+}

The 3 substrates of this enzyme are androsterone, NAD^{+}, and NADP^{+}, whereas its 4 products are 5alpha-androstane-3,17-dione, NADH, NADPH, and H^{+}.

This enzyme belongs to the family of oxidoreductases, specifically those acting on the CH-OH group of donor with NAD^{+} or NADP^{+} as acceptor, more specifically it is part of the group of hydroxysteroid dehydrogenases. The systematic name of this enzyme class is 3alpha-hydroxysteroid:NAD(P)^{+} oxidoreductase (A-specific).

== Structural studies ==
As of late 2007, 11 structures have been solved for this class of enzymes, with PDB accession codes 1J96, 1LWI, 1S1P, 1S1R, 1S2A, 1S2C, 1XJB, 2F38, 2FGB, 2HDJ, and 2IPJ.
