= Androstenediol sulfate =

Names
- IUPAC name 17β-Hydroxyandrost-5-en-3β-yl hydrogen sulfate
- Systematic IUPAC name (1S,3aS,3bR,7S,9aR,9bS,11aS)-1-Hydroxy-9a,11a-dimethyl-2,3,3a,3b,4,6,7,8,9,9a,9b,10,11,11a-tetradecahydro-1H-cyclopenta[a]phenanthren-7-yl hydrogen sulfate
- Other names Androst-5-ene-3β,17β-diol 3β-sulfate; 3β,17β-Dihydroxyandrost-5-ene 3β-sulfate; A5 sulfate

Identifiers
CAS Number	977-33-3
3D model (JSmol)	Interactive image
ChemSpider	19980780
PubChem CID	13847309
CompTox Dashboard (EPA)	DTXSID40976295
- InChI: InChI=1S/C19H30O5S/c1-18-9-7-13(24-25(21,22)23)11-12(18)3-4-14-15-5-6-17(20)19(15,2)10-8-16(14)18/h3,13-17,20H,4-11H2,1-2H3,(H,21,22,23)/t13-,14-,15-,16-,17-,18-,19-/m0/s1 Key: HXJFCUUBVWOORF-LOVVWNRFSA-N
- SMILES: C[C@]12CC[C@H]3[C@H]([C@@H]1CC[C@@H]2O)CC=C4[C@@]3(CC[C@@H](C4)OS(=O)(=O)O)C

Properties
Chemical formula	C_{19}H_{30}O_{5}S
Molar mass	370.50 g·mol^{−1}
- Except where otherwise noted, data are given for materials in their standard state (at 25 °C [77 °F], 100 kPa). Infobox references

Androstenediol sulfate, also known as androst-5-ene-3β,17β-diol 3β-sulfate, is an endogenous, naturally occurring steroid and a urinary metabolites of androstenediol. It is a steroid sulfate which is formed from sulfation of androstenediol by steroid sulfotransferase and can be desulfated back into androstenediol by steroid sulfatase.

== See also ==
- Steroid sulfate
- C_{19}H_{30}O_{5}S
