= C18H24O5S =

The molecular formula C_{18}H_{24}O_{5}S (molar mass: 352.45 g/mol, exact mass: 352.1344 u) may refer to:

- Estradiol 17β-sulfate
- Estradiol sulfate (E2S), or 17β-estradiol 3-sulfate
