= Estrone sulfotransferase =

Enzyme

Identifiers
- EC no.: 2.8.2.4
- CAS no.: 9026-06-6
- Alt. names: Estrogen sulfotransferase; EST

Databases
- IntEnz: IntEnz view
- BRENDA: BRENDA entry
- ExPASy: NiceZyme view
- KEGG: KEGG entry
- MetaCyc: metabolic pathway
- PRIAM: profile
- PDB structures: RCSB PDB PDBe PDBsum
- Gene Ontology: AmiGO / QuickGO
Search
- PMC: articles
- PubMed: articles
- NCBI: proteins

Estrone sulfotransferase (EST) (EC 2.8.2.4), also known as estrogen sulfotransferase, is an enzyme that catalyzes the transformation of an unconjugated estrogen like estrone into a sulfated estrogen like estrone sulfate. It is a steroid sulfotransferase and belongs to the family of transferases, to be specific, the sulfotransferases, which transfer sulfur-containing groups. This enzyme participates in androgen and estrogen metabolism and sulfur metabolism.

Steroid sulfatase is an enzyme that catalyzes the reverse reaction, the transfer of a sulfate to an unconjugated estrogen.

== Reaction ==
Estrone sulfotransferase is an enzyme characterised from bovine adrenal glands that catalyzes the following chemical reaction:

estrone
+
PAPS
estrone sulfate
+
adenosine 3',5'-bisphosphate

This converts estrone to estrone sulfate by transferring a sulfate group from the cofactor 3'-phosphoadenosine-5'-phosphosulfate (PAPS) and giving adenosine 3',5'-bisphosphate as a byproduct. The enzyme also catalyzes the same reaction for estradiol, with estradiol sulfate as the product.

=== Types ===
Two isoforms have been identified that are thought to represent estrone sulfotransferase (EST) in humans:

- SULT1A1 (catalyzes the reactions estradiol to estradiol sulfate and, to a lesser extent than SULT1E1, estrone to estrone sulfate)
- SULT1E1 (catalyzes the reactions estrone to estrone sulfate and estradiol to estradiol sulfate)

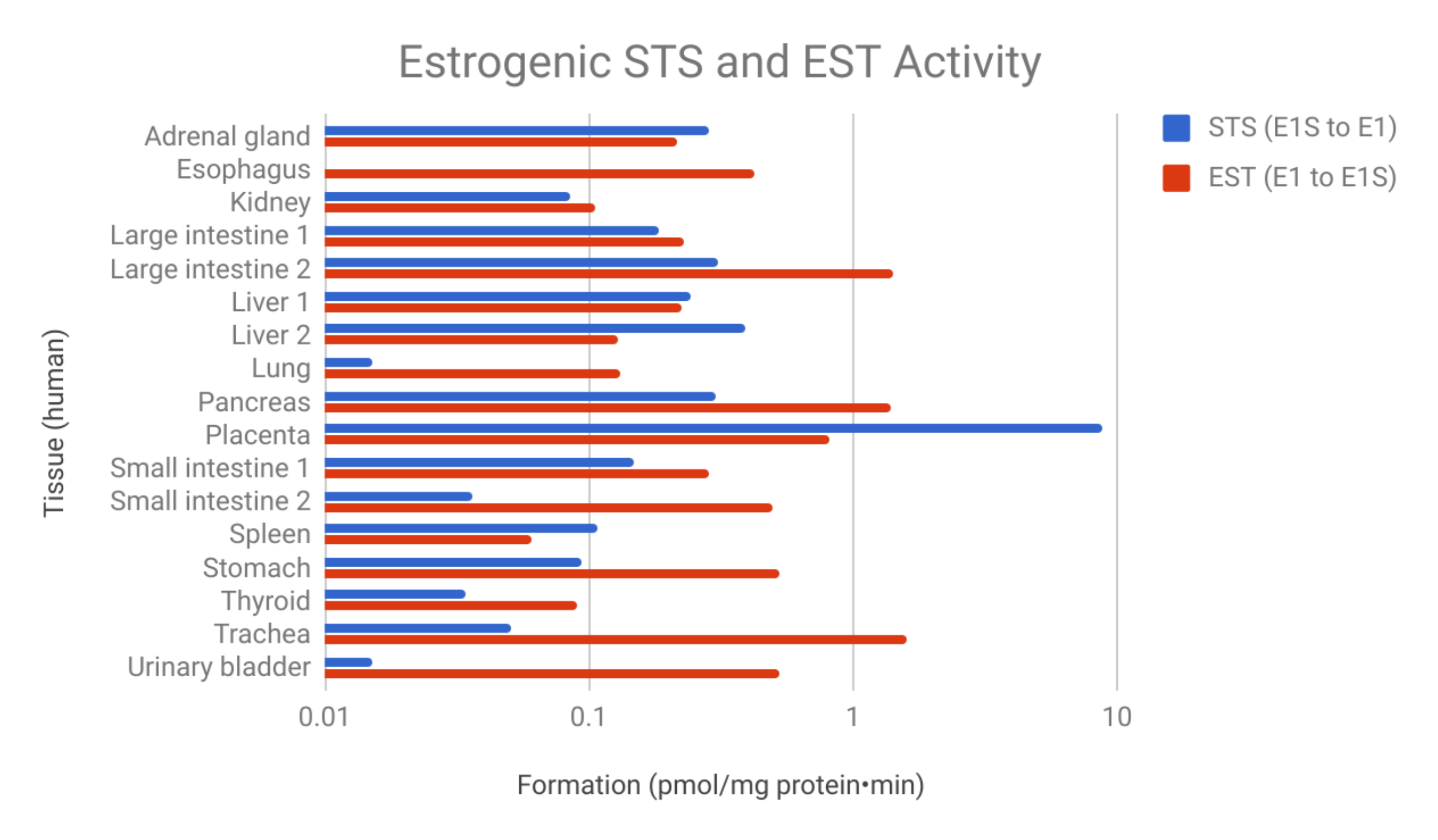
Distribution of STS and EST activities for interconversion of estradiol and estrone in adult human tissues.

== Structure ==
As of late 2007, 5 structures have been solved for this class of enzymes, with PDB accession codes PDB: 1AQU, PDB: 1AQY, PDB: 1BO6, PDB: 1G3M, and PDB: 1HY3.

== Names ==
The systematic name of this enzyme class is 3'-phosphoadenylyl-sulfate:estrone 3-sulfotransferase. Other names in common use include 3'-phosphoadenylyl sulfate-estrone 3-sulfotransferase, estrogen sulfotransferase, estrogen sulphotransferase, oestrogen sulphotransferase, and 3'-phosphoadenylylsulfate:oestrone sulfotransferase.

== See also ==
- Steroidogenic enzyme
- Estrogen sulfotransferase
