= Desmolase =

Class of enzymes

A desmolase is any of various enzymes that catalyze the formation or destruction of carbon-carbon bonds within a molecule. These enzymes play a significant role in cellular respiration and in fermentation. Desmolases are involved in steroidogenesis.

Examples of desmolases are:

- Cholesterol side-chain cleavage enzyme, also called 20,22-desmolase; converts cholesterol to pregnenolone.
- 17,20-Desmolase, also called CYP17A1 or 17α-hydroxylase; converts pregnenolone to 17α-hydroxypregnenolone, and progesterone to 17α-hydroxyprogesterone.
- Diacetyl desmolase is added to beer late in the brewing process to remove diacetyl flavor that may have accumulated during processing.

== See also ==
- Steroidogenic enzyme
