= C19H30O5S =

The molecular formula C_{19}H_{30}O_{5}S (molar mass: 370.50 g/mol, exact mass: 370.1814 u) may refer to:

- Androstenediol sulfate
- Androsterone sulfate
