= Estradiol 17β-sulfate =

Names
- IUPAC name 3-Hydroxyestra-1,3,5(10)-trien-17β-yl hydrogen sulfate
- Systematic IUPAC name (1S,3aS,3bR,9bS,11aS)-7-Hydroxy-11a-methyl-2,3,3a,3b,4,5,9b,10,11,11a-decahydro-1H-cyclopenta[a]phenanthren-1-yl hydrogen sulfate
- Other names Estra-1,3,5(10)-triene-3,17β-diol 17β-(hydrogen sulfate)

Identifiers
CAS Number	3233-69-0
3D model (JSmol)	Interactive image
ChEBI	CHEBI:191192
ChemSpider	59802
PubChem CID	66429
UNII	RXS2JRB6Z8
CompTox Dashboard (EPA)	DTXSID50954120
- InChI: InChI=1S/C18H24O5S/c1-18-9-8-14-13-5-3-12(19)10-11(13)2-4-15(14)16(18)6-7-17(18)23-24(20,21)22/h3,5,10,14-17,19H,2,4,6-9H2,1H3,(H,20,21,22)/t14-,15-,16+,17+,18+/m1/s1 Key: JSUDNGPWAXYETN-ZBRFXRBCSA-N
- SMILES: C[C@]12CC[C@H]3[C@H]([C@@H]1CC[C@@H]2OS(=O)(=O)O)CCC4=C3C=CC(=C4)O

Properties
Chemical formula	C_{18}H_{24}O_{5}S
Molar mass	352.45 g·mol^{−1}
- Except where otherwise noted, data are given for materials in their standard state (at 25 °C [77 °F], 100 kPa). Infobox references

Estradiol 17β-sulfate is an estrogen conjugate which is produced from estradiol by sulfation of the C17β hydroxyl group by estrogen sulfotransferases.

== See also ==
- Estradiol 3-sulfate
