= Steroid reductase =

Steroidogenesis of steroid hormones.

Steroid reductases are reductase enzymes that are involved in steroid biosynthesis and metabolism. They include:

- 5α-Reductase
- 5β-Reductase

== See also ==
- Steroidogenic enzyme
