= Hydroxysteroid dehydrogenase =

Class of oxidoreductase enzymes

Steroidogenesis.

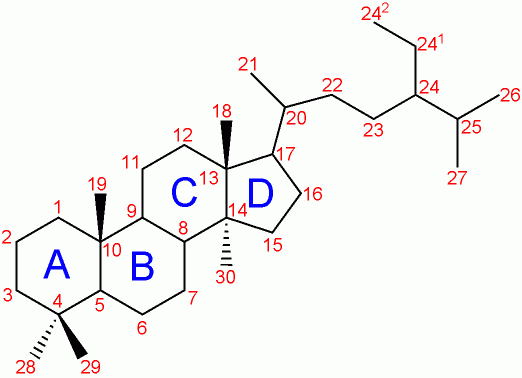
Steroid numbering.

Hydroxysteroid dehydrogenases (HSDs) are a group of alcohol oxidoreductases that catalyze the dehydrogenation of hydroxysteroids. These enzymes also catalyze the reverse reaction, acting as ketosteroid reductases (KSRs).

There are four types, classified by the number of the position acted upon:

Carbon	Hydroxysteroid	Ketosteroid
3α-HSD	3α-Androstanediol	Dihydrotestosterone
3α-HSD	3α-Etiocholanediol	5β-Dihydrotestosterone
3β-HSD	Pregnenolone	Progesterone
3β-HSD	17α-Hydroxypregnenolone	17α-Hydroxyprogesterone
3β-HSD	Dehydroepiandrosterone	Androstenedione
3β-HSD	Androstenediol	Testosterone
11β-HSD	Cortisol	Cortisone
17β-HSD	Androstenedione	Testosterone
17β-HSD	Androstanedione	Dihydrotestosterone
17β-HSD	Estrone	Estradiol
20β-HSD	Progesterone	20α-Dihydroprogesterone

== See also ==
- Steroidogenic enzyme
- Steroid hydroxylase
