= Prasterone sulfate =

Medication

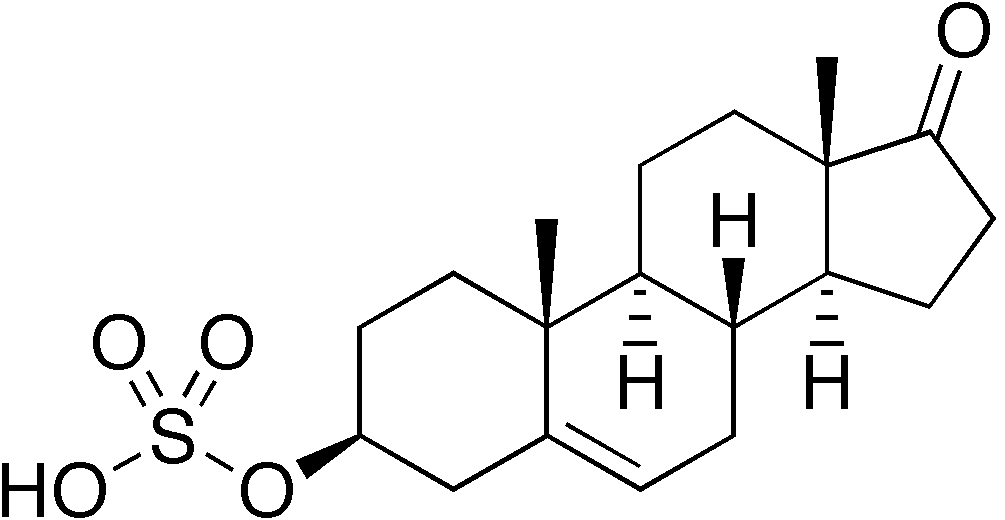

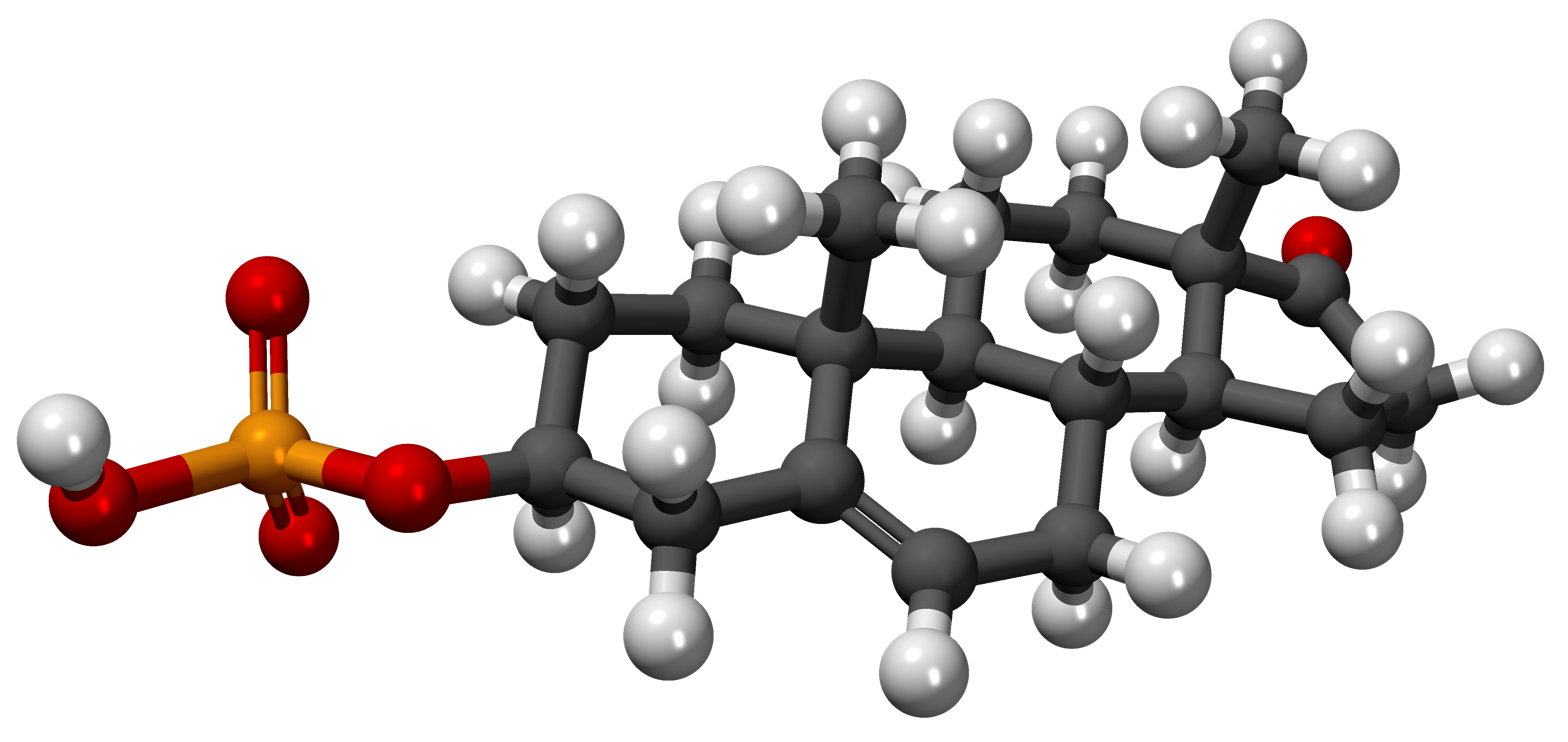

Clinical data
- Trade names: Astenile, Dastonil, Di Luo An, Dinistenile, Levospa, Mylis, Sinsurrene, Teloin
- Other names: DHEA sulfate; DHEA-S; Sodium prasterone sulfate; Sodium prasterone sulfate hydrate; KYH-3102; NSC-72822; PB-005
- Routes of administration: Injection
- Drug class: Androgen; Anabolic steroid; Androgen ester; Estrogen; Neurosteroid

Identifiers
- IUPAC name: [(3S,8R,9S,10R,13S,14S)-10,13-dimethyl-17-oxo-1,2,3,4,7,8,9,11,12,14,15,16-dodecahydrocyclopenta[a]phenanthren-3-yl] hydrogen sulfate
- CAS Number: 651-48-9 1099-87-2
- PubChem CID: 12594
- ChemSpider: 12074
- UNII: 57B09Q7FJR
- ChEBI: CHEBI:16814
- ChEMBL: ChEMBL259898

Chemical and physical data
- Formula: C_{19}H_{28}O_{5}S
- Molar mass: 368.49 g·mol^{−1}
- 3D model (JSmol): Interactive image
- SMILES: C[C@]12CC[C@H]3[C@H]([C@@H]1CCC2=O)CC=C4[C@@]3(CC[C@@H](C4)OS(=O)(=O)O)C
- InChI: InChI=1S/C19H28O5S/c1-18-9-7-13(24-25(21,22)23)11-12(18)3-4-14-15-5-6-17(20)19(15,2)10-8-16(14)18/h3,13-16H,4-11H2,1-2H3,(H,21,22,23)/t13-,14-,15-,16-,18-,19-/m0/s1; Key:CZWCKYRVOZZJNM-USOAJAOKSA-N

Prasterone sulfate (brand names Astenile, Mylis, Teloin, others), also known as dehydroepiandrosterone sulfate (DHEA-S), is a naturally occurring androstane steroid which is marketed and used in Japan and other countries as a labor inducer in the treatment of insufficient cervical ripening and dilation during childbirth. It is the C3β sulfate ester of prasterone (dehydroepiandrosterone; DHEA), and is known to act as a prohormone of DHEA and by extension of androgens and estrogens, although it also has its own activity as a neurosteroid. Prasterone sulfate is used medically as the sodium salt via injection and is referred to by the name sodium prasterone sulfate (JAN).

Prasterone sulfate is available in Japan, Italy, Portugal, Argentina, and China. Brand names include Astenile, Dastonil, Di Luo An, Dinistenile, Levospa, Mylis, Sinsurrene, and Teloin.

== See also ==
- List of androgen esters § Esters of other natural AAS
