= Fluasterone =

Chemical compound

Clinical data
- Other names: 3β-Dehydroxy-16α-fluoro-DHEA; Fl-DHEA; DHEF; DHEA 8354; DHEA analogue 8354; HE-2500; 16α-Fluoroandrost-5-en-17-one

Identifiers
- IUPAC name: (8R,9S,10R,13S,14S,16R)-16-Fluoro-10,13-dimethyl-1,2,3,4,7,8,9,11,12,14,15,16-dodecahydrocyclopenta[a]phenanthren-17-one
- CAS Number: 112859-71-9
- PubChem CID: 133967
- ChemSpider: 118130
- UNII: R7M5UGD04G
- CompTox Dashboard (EPA): DTXSID90920920

Chemical and physical data
- Formula: C_{19}H_{27}FO
- Molar mass: 290.422 g·mol^{−1}
- 3D model (JSmol): Interactive image
- SMILES: C[C@]12CCCCC1=CC[C@@H]3[C@@H]2CC[C@]4([C@H]3C[C@H](C4=O)F)C
- InChI: InChI=1S/C19H27FO/c1-18-9-4-3-5-12(18)6-7-13-14(18)8-10-19(2)15(13)11-16(20)17(19)21/h6,13-16H,3-5,7-11H2,1-2H3/t13-,14+,15+,16-,18+,19+/m1/s1; Key:VHZXNQKVFDBFIK-NBBHSKLNSA-N

Fluasterone, also known as 3β-dehydroxy-16α-fluoro-DHEA or 16α-fluoroandrost-5-en-17-one, is a fluorinated synthetic analogue of dehydroepiandrosterone (DHEA) which was under investigation by Aeson Therapeutics for a variety of therapeutic indications including cancer, cardiovascular diseases, diabetes, obesity, and traumatic brain injury among others but was ultimately never marketed. It is a modification of DHEA in which the C3β hydroxyl has been removed and a hydrogen atom has been substituted with a fluorine atom at the C16α position. Fluasterone reached phase II clinical trials prior to the discontinuation of its development.

The mechanism of action of DHEA and fluasterone is unknown. However, similarly to DHEA but more strongly, fluasterone is a potent uncompetitive inhibitor of G6PDH (K_{i} = 0.5 μM versus 17 μM for DHEA). The drug retains the antiinflammatory, antihyperplastic, chemopreventative, antihyperlipidemic, antidiabetic, and antiobesic, as well as certain immunomodulating activities of DHEA, much but not all of which it is thought may possibly be mediated via G6PDH inhibition (with some experimental evidence to support this notion available).

Conversely, unlike DHEA, fluasterone has minimal or no androgenic or estrogenic activity, and due to the presence of the fluorine atom at the C16α position, its metabolism at the C17α position is sterically hindered and thus it cannot be metabolized into androgens like testosterone or estrogens like estradiol. Also in contrast to DHEA, fluasterone does not produce sedation or seizures in animals and hence is not thought to interact with the GABA_{A} receptor. In addition, unlike DHEA, fluasterone has reduced or no effects as a peroxisome proliferator (i.e., lacks activity at the PPARα), and hence does not pose a risk of liver toxicities such as hepatomegaly or hepatocellular carcinoma. It is for these reasons that fluasterone was developed and was considered to be advantageous to DHEA.

Due to extensive first-pass hepatic and/or gastrointestinal metabolism, very high doses of DHEA and fluasterone are necessary for effectiveness. In animals, the efficacy of fluasterone is increased 40-fold when administered parenterally, and for this reason, a non-oral formulation of fluasterone was selected for clinical development. However, the development of fluasterone was nonetheless stopped reportedly due to its low potency and low oral bioavailability, which are said to have rendered it unsuitable for clinical use.
