= Steroidogenic enzyme =

Type of enzyme

Steroidogenesis of steroid hormones.

Steroidogenic enzymes are enzymes that are involved in steroidogenesis and steroid biosynthesis. They are responsible for the biosynthesis of the steroid hormones, including sex steroids (androgens, estrogens, and progestogens) and corticosteroids (glucocorticoids and mineralocorticoids), as well as neurosteroids, from cholesterol. Steroidogenic enzymes are most highly expressed in classical steroidogenic tissues, such as the testis, ovary, and adrenal cortex, but are also present in other tissues in the body.

== List of steroidogenic enzymes ==
- Steroid desmolases
  - Cholesterol side-chain cleavage enzyme (20,22-desmolase) – steroid synthesis
  - 17,20-Lyase (17,20-desmolase) – androgen synthesis
- Steroid hydroxylases
  - 11β-Hydroxylase – corticosteroid synthesis
  - 17α-Hydroxylase – androgen and glucocorticoid synthesis
  - 18-Hydroxylase (aldosterone synthase) – mineralocorticoid synthesis
  - 21-Hydroxylase – corticosteroid synthesis
  - Cytochrome P450 (CYP1, 2, 3) – estrogen metabolism
- Hydroxysteroid dehydrogenases (and ketosteroid reductases)
  - 3α-Hydroxysteroid dehydrogenase – androgen, progestogen, and neurosteroid synthesis and metabolism
  - 3β-Hydroxysteroid dehydrogenase/Δ^{5-4}-isomerase (1, 2) – androgen, progestogen, and neurosteroid synthesis
  - 11β-Hydroxysteroid dehydrogenase (1, 2) – corticosteroid synthesis and metabolism
  - 17β-Hydroxysteroid dehydrogenase (1–15) – androgen, estrogen, and progestogen synthesis and metabolism
  - 20α-Hydroxysteroid dehydrogenase – progestogen synthesis and metabolism
  - 20β-Hydroxysteroid dehydrogenase – progestogen synthesis and metabolism

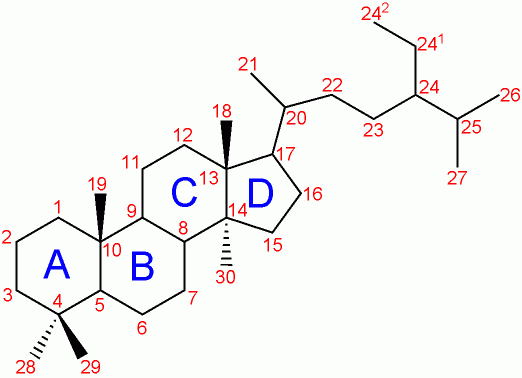
Steroid numbering.

- Steroid reductases
  - 5α-Reductase (1, 2, 3) – androgen and neurosteroid synthesis, progestogen metabolism
  - 5β-Reductase – androgen and progestogen metabolism, neurosteroid synthesis
- Conjugation (and deconjugation)
  - Glucuronosyltransferase (UGT2Bs) – steroid metabolism
  - Glucuronidase (β-glucuronidase) – steroid synthesis
  - Steroid sulfotransferase (SULT1A1, 1E1, 2A1, 2B1a, 2B1b) – steroid metabolism, neurosteroid synthesis
  - Steroid sulfatase – steroid synthesis, neurosteroid metabolism
- Others
  - Aromatase (estrogen synthetase) – estrogen synthesis

== See also ==
- Inborn errors of steroid metabolism
- Steroidogenesis inhibitor
