= Steroid hydroxylase =

Class of enzymes involved in steroid synthesis

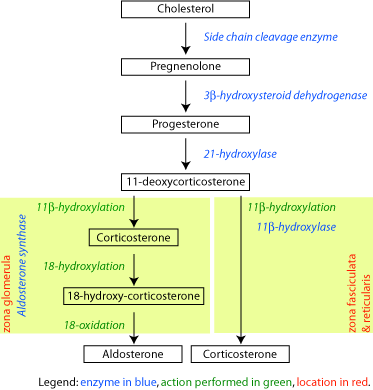
Corticosteroid biosynthetic pathway in rat

A steroid hydroxylase is a class of hydroxylase enzymes involved in the biosynthesis of steroids.

== See also ==
- Steroidogenic enzyme

== Additional images ==
Steroidogenesis

Steroid nomenclature — numbering of carbons

Production of DHEA from Cholesterol
