= Cholesterol side-chain cleavage enzyme =

Mammalian protein found in humans

CYP11A1
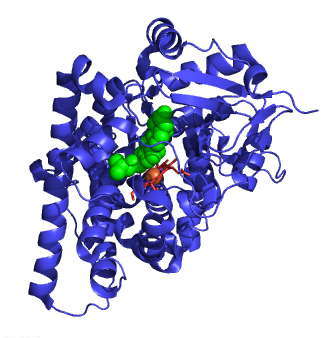

Identifiers
- Aliases: CYP11A1, CYP11A, CYPXIA1, P450SCC, cytochrome P450 family 11 subfamily A member 1
- External IDs: OMIM: 118485; MGI: 88582; GeneCards: CYP11A1
Available structures
PDB	Ortholog search: PDBe RCSB
PDB	List of PDB id codes 3NA1, 3N9Y, 3N9Z, 3NA0
Enzyme activity
EC #	BRENDA	ExPASy	KEGG	MetaCyc
1.14.15.6	↗	↗	↗	↗

Gene location (Human)
Chr.	Chromosome 15 (human)
Band	15q24.1	Start	74,337,759 bp
Band	15q24.1	End	74,367,646 bp

Gene location (Mouse)
Chr.	Chromosome 9 (mouse)
Band	9 B|9 31.63 cM	Start	57,913,694 bp
Band	9 B|9 31.63 cM	End	57,934,306 bp
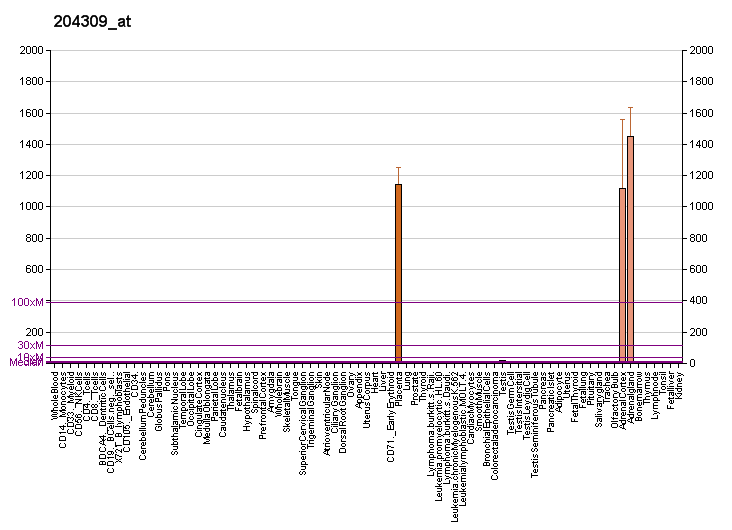
RNA expression pattern
Bgee	Human / Mouse (ortholog); Top expressed in: right adrenal gland; right adrenal cortex; left adrenal gland; left adrenal cortex; placenta; right uterine tube; left ovary; medulla oblongata; right testis; left testis / Top expressed in: adrenal gland; decidua; gastrula; Gonadal ridge; testicle; dermis; seminiferous tubule; spermatocyte; ovary; yolk sac; More reference expression data
BioGPS	More reference expression data
Gene ontology
Molecular function	iron ion binding; metal ion binding; monooxygenase activity; heme binding; oxidoreductase activity, acting on paired donors, with incorporation or reduction of molecular oxygen; oxidoreductase activity; cholesterol monooxygenase (side-chain-cleaving) activity; protein binding
Cellular component	membrane; mitochondrial matrix; mitochondrion; mitochondrial inner membrane
Biological process	vitamin D metabolic process; C21-steroid hormone metabolic process; lipid metabolism; cholesterol metabolic process; C21-steroid hormone biosynthetic process; sterol metabolic process; steroid biosynthetic process; steroid metabolic process; glucocorticoid biosynthetic process; cellular response to peptide hormone stimulus; cortisol metabolic process
Sources:Amigo / QuickGO
Orthologs
Databases	NCBI: entry; OMA: entry
Species	Human	Mouse
Entrez	1583	13070
Ensembl	ENSG00000140459; ENSG00000288362	ENSMUSG00000032323
UniProt	P05108	Q9QZ82
RefSeq (mRNA)	NM_001099773; NM_000781	NM_019779; NM_001346787
RefSeq (protein)	NP_000772; NP_001093243	NP_001333716; NP_062753
Location (UCSC)	Chr 15: 74.34 – 74.37 Mb	Chr 9: 57.91 – 57.93 Mb
PubMed search
- Wikidata
View/Edit Human	View/Edit Mouse

Cholesterol side-chain cleavage enzyme is commonly referred to as P450scc, where "scc" is an abbreviation for side-chain cleavage, and more properly named CYP11A1. P450scc is a mitochondrial enzyme that catalyzes conversion of cholesterol to pregnenolone. This is the first reaction in the process of steroidogenesis in all mammalian tissues that specialize in the production of various steroid hormones.

cholesterol + 3 NADPH + 3 H^{+} + 3 O_{2} ⇄ pregnenolone + 4-methylpentanal + 3 NADP^{+} + 3 H_{2}O

P450scc is a member of the cytochrome P450 superfamily of enzymes (family 11, subfamily A, polypeptide 1) and is encoded by the CYP11A1 gene. The enzyme is sometimes referred to as cholesterol desmolase, due to the breaking of the carbon bonds (desmolysis).

== Nomenclature ==
cholesterol monooxygenase (side-chain-cleaving)

Identifiers
- EC no.: 1.14.15.6
- CAS no.: 37292-81-2

Databases
- BRENDA: enzyme data
- ExPASy: NiceZyme view
- KEGG: enzyme entry
- MetaCyc: metabolic pathway
- Rhea: reactions
- PDB structures: RCSB PDB PDBe PDBsum
- Gene Ontology: AmiGO / QuickGO
Search
- PMC: articles
- PubMed: articles
- NCBI: proteins

The systematic name of this enzyme class is cholesterol, reduced-adrenal-ferredoxin:oxygen oxidoreductase (side-chain-cleaving). Other names include:

- C27-side-chain cleavage enzyme
- cholesterol 20-22-desmolase
- cholesterol C20-22 desmolase
- cholesterol desmolase
- cholesterol side-chain cleavage enzyme
- cholesterol side-chain-cleaving enzyme
- cytochrome P-450scc
- desmolase, steroid 20-22
- enzymes, cholesterol side-chain-cleaving
- steroid 20-22 desmolase
- steroid 20-22-lyase.

== Tissue and intracellular localization ==
The highest level of the cholesterol side-chain cleavage system is found in the adrenal cortex and the corpus luteum. The system is also expressed at high levels in steroidogenic theca cells in the ovary, and Leydig cells in the testis. During pregnancy, the placenta also expresses significant levels of this enzyme system. P450scc is also present at much lower levels in several other tissue types, including the brain. In the adrenal cortex, the concentration of adrenodoxin is similar to that of P450scc, but adrenodoxin reductase is expressed at lower levels.

Immunofluorescence studies using specific antibodies against P450scc system enzymes have demonstrated that proteins are located exclusively within the mitochondria. P450scc is associated with the inner mitochondrial membrane, facing the interior (matrix). Adrenodoxin and adrenodoxin reductase are soluble peripheral membrane proteins located inside the mitochondrial matrix that appear to associate with each other primarily through electrostatic interactions.

== Mechanism of action ==
P450scc catalyzes the conversion of cholesterol to pregnenolone in three monooxygenase reactions. These involve 2 hydroxylations of the cholesterol side-chain, which generate, first, 22R-hydroxycholesterol and then 20alpha,22R-dihydroxycholesterol. The final step cleaves the bond between carbons 20 and 22, resulting in the production of pregnenolone and isocaproic aldehyde.

Each monooxygenase step requires 2 electrons (reducing equivalents). The initial source of the electrons is NADPH. The electrons are transferred from NADPH to P450scc via two electron transfer proteins: adrenodoxin reductase and adrenodoxin. All three proteins together constitute the cholesterol side-chain cleavage complex.

The involvement of three proteins in cholesterol side-chain cleavage reaction raises the question of whether the three proteins function as a ternary complex as reductase:adrenodoxin:P450. Both spectroscopic studies of adrenodoxin binding to P450scc and kinetic studies in the presence of varying concentrations of adrenodoxin reductase demonstrated that the reductase competes with P450scc for binding to adrenodoxin. These results demonstrated that the formation of a functional ternary complex is not possible. From these studies, it was concluded that the binding sites of adrenodoxin to its reductase and to P450 are overlapping and, as a consequence, adrenodoxin functions as a mobile electron shuttle between reductase and P450. These conclusions have been confirmed by structural analysis of adrenodoxin and P450 complex.

The process of electron transfer from NADPH to P450scc is not tightly coupled; that is, during electron transfer from adrenodoxin reductase via adrenodoxin to P450scc, a certain portion of the electrons leak outside of the chain and react with O_{2}, generating superoxide radicals. Steroidogenic cells include a diverse array of antioxidant systems to cope with the radicals generated by the steroidogenic enzymes.

== Regulation ==
In each steroidogenic cell, the expression of the P450scc system proteins is regulated by the trophic hormonal system specific for the cell type. In adrenal cortex cells from zona fasciculata, the expression of the mRNAs encoding all three P450scc proteins is induced by corticotropin (ACTH). The trophic hormones increase CYP11A1 gene expression through transcription factors such as steroidogenic factor 1 (SF-1), by the α isoform of activating protein 2 (AP-2) in the human, and many others. The production of this enzyme is inhibited notably by the nuclear receptor DAX-1.

P450scc is always active, however its activity is limited by the supply of cholesterol in the inner membrane. The supplying of cholesterol to this membrane (from the outer mitochondrial membrane) is, thus, considered the true rate-limiting step in steroid production. This step is mediated primarily by the steroidogenic acute regulatory protein (StAR or STARD1). Upon stimulation of a cell to make steroid, the amount of StAR available to transfer cholesterol to the inner membrane limits how fast the reaction can go (the acute phase). With prolonged (chronic) stimulation, it is thought that cholesterol supply becomes no longer an issue and that the capacity of the system to make steroid (i.e., level of P450scc in the mitochondria) is now more important.

Corticotropin (ACTH) is a hormone that is released from the anterior pituitary in response to stress situations. A study of the steroidogenic capacity of the adrenal cortex in infants with acute respiratory disease demonstrated that indeed during disease state there is a specific increase in the steroidogenic capacity for the synthesis of the glucocorticoid cortisol but not for the mineralocorticoid aldosterone or androgen DHEAS that are secreted from other zones of the adrenal cortex.

== Pathology ==
Mutations in the CYP11A1 gene result in a steroid hormone deficiency, causing a minority of cases of the rare and potentially fatal condition lipoid congenital adrenal hyperplasia. Deficiency of CYP11A1 can result in hyperpigmentation, hypoglycemia, and recurrent infections.

== Inhibitors ==
Cholesterol side-chain cleavage enzyme inhibitors include aminoglutethimide, ketoconazole, and mitotane, among others.

== Steroid hormone synthesis ==
Steroidogenesis, showing cholesterol side-chain cleavage enzyme at top.

Steroid hormone synthesis

== Additional images ==
Cholesterol

Pregnenolone

== See also ==
- Steroidogenic enzyme
- Cytochrome P450 oxidase
