= Steroid sulfotransferase =

Class of enzymes

Identifiers
- EC no.: 2.8.2.15
- CAS no.: 9032-76-2

Databases
- BRENDA: enzyme data
- ExPASy: NiceZyme view
- KEGG: enzyme entry
- MetaCyc: metabolic pathway
- Rhea: reactions
- PDB structures: RCSB PDB PDBe PDBsum
- Gene Ontology: AmiGO / QuickGO
Search
- PMC: articles
- PubMed: articles
- NCBI: proteins

A steroid sulfotransferase (EC 2.8.2.15) is an enzyme that catalyzes the general chemical reaction

a phenolic steroid +
PAPS
steroid O-sulfate +
adenosine 3',5'-bisphosphate

It uses the cofactor 3'-phosphoadenosine-5'-phosphosulfate (PAPS) and gives adenosine 3',5'-bisphosphate as a byproduct. For example, the enzyme characterised from adrenal glands converts estradiol to estradiol sulfate:

estradiol
+ PAPS
estradiol sulfate
+ adenosine 3',5'-
bisphosphate

This enzyme is a transferase, specifically a sulfotransferase, which transfer sulfur-containing groups. The systematic name of this enzyme class is 3'-phosphoadenylyl-sulfate:phenolic-steroid sulfotransferase. This enzyme is also called steroid alcohol sulfotransferase.

== Genes ==
Of 62 sulfotransferase genes in the human genome, 16 represent cytoplasmic sulfotransferases, and of these 16 cytoplasmic sulfotransferases, five have been found to act as steroid sulfotransferases. These five sulfotransferase genes are SULT1A1, SULT1E1, and SULT2A1, as well as the two isoforms of SULT2B1, SULT2B1a and SULT2B1b. Their substrate specificity is as follows:

- SULT1A1: Estradiol (to estradiol sulfate)
- SULT1E1: DHEA (to DHEA sulfate); Estrone (to estrone sulfate); Estradiol (to estradiol sulfate)
- SULT2A1: DHEA (to DHEA sulfate); Androsterone (to androsterone sulfate); Pregnenolone (to pregnenolone sulfate)
- SULT2B1a: Pregnenolone (to pregnenolone sulfate)
- SULT2B1b: Cholesterol (to cholesterol sulfate)

Traditionally, steroid sulfotransferases have been named according to their preferred substrate, for instance estrogen sulfotransferase (SULT1E1) and DHEA sulfotransferase (SULT2A1). However, cytosolic steroid sulfotransferases show broad substrate specificity, and SULT1E1 and SULT2A1 are not the only steroid sulfotransferases that sulfate estrogens and DHEA, respectively.

== See also ==
- Estrogen sulfotransferase
- Estrone sulfotransferase
- Steroid sulfatase
- Steroidogenic enzyme
