= SULT2B1 =

Protein-coding gene in the species Homo sapiens

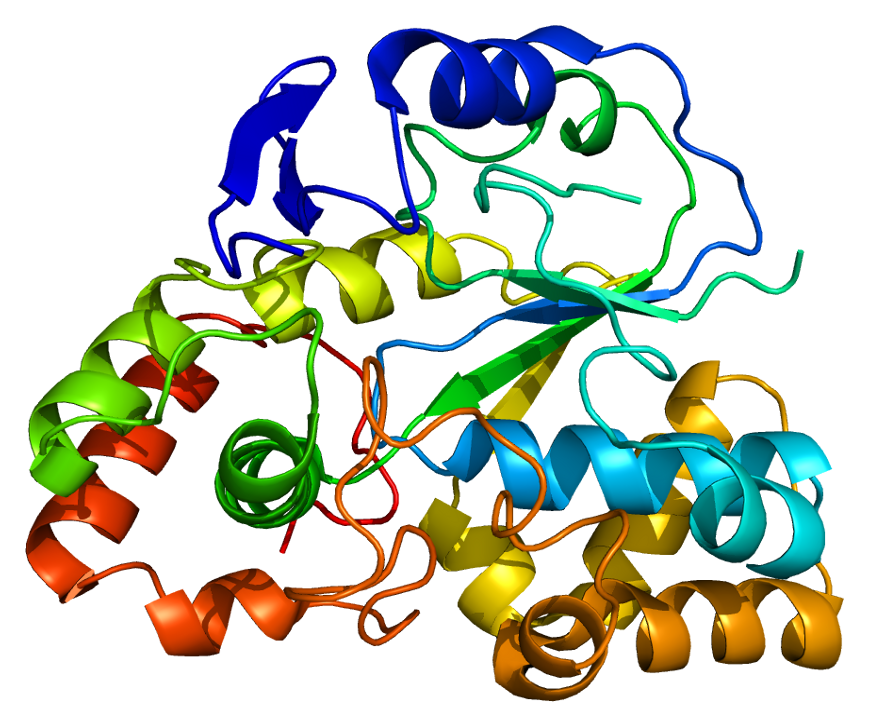

Identifiers
- Aliases: SULT2B1, HSST2, sulfotransferase family 2B member 1, ARCI14
- External IDs: OMIM: 604125; MGI: 1926342; GeneCards: SULT2B1
Available structures
PDB	Ortholog search: PDBe RCSB
PDB	List of PDB id codes 1Q1Q, 1Q1Z, 1Q20, 1Q22
Enzyme activity
EC #	BRENDA	ExPASy	KEGG	MetaCyc
2.8.2.2	↗	↗	↗	↗

Gene location (Human)
Chr.	Chromosome 19 (human)
Band	19q13.33	Start	48,552,172 bp
Band	19q13.33	End	48,599,425 bp

Gene location (Mouse)
Chr.	Chromosome 7 (mouse)
Band	7|7 B3	Start	45,379,407 bp
Band	7|7 B3	End	45,434,093 bp
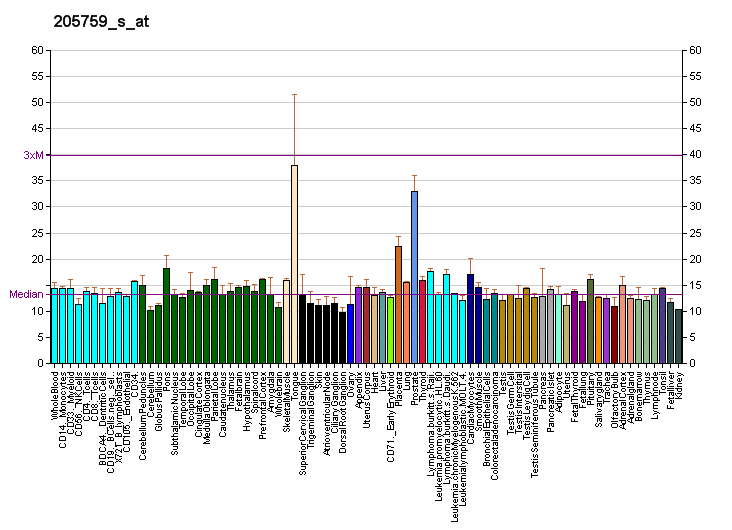
RNA expression pattern
Bgee	Human / Mouse (ortholog); Top expressed in: skin of abdomen; skin of leg; gingival epithelium; skin of arm; mucosa of pharynx; oral cavity; vulva; skin of thigh; epithelium of esophagus; cervix epithelium / Top expressed in: lip; esophagus; jejunum; duodenum; skin of abdomen; skin of external ear; intestinal villus; ileum; skin of back; epidermis; More reference expression data
BioGPS	More reference expression data
Gene ontology
Molecular function	transferase activity; sulfotransferase activity; protein binding; alcohol sulfotransferase activity; steroid sulfotransferase activity; nucleic acid binding; cholesterol binding; steroid hormone binding
Cellular component	extracellular exosome; endoplasmic reticulum; intracellular membrane-bounded organelle; nucleus; cytoplasm; cytosol
Biological process	steroid metabolic process; sulfate assimilation; lipid metabolism; 3'-phosphoadenosine 5'-phosphosulfate metabolic process; cholesterol metabolic process; negative regulation of cell population proliferation; positive regulation of epidermal cell differentiation
Sources:Amigo / QuickGO
Orthologs
Databases	NCBI: entry; OMA: entry
Species	Human	Mouse
Entrez	6820	54200
Ensembl	ENSG00000088002	ENSMUSG00000003271
UniProt	O00204	O35400
RefSeq (mRNA)	NM_004605; NM_177973	NM_017465; NM_001360784
RefSeq (protein)	NP_004596; NP_814444	NP_059493; NP_001347713
Location (UCSC)	Chr 19: 48.55 – 48.6 Mb	Chr 7: 45.38 – 45.43 Mb
PubMed search
- Wikidata
View/Edit Human	View/Edit Mouse

Sulfotransferase family cytosolic 2B member 1 is an enzyme that in humans is encoded by the SULT2B1 gene.

Sulfotransferase enzymes catalyze the sulfate conjugation of many hormones, neurotransmitters, drugs, and xenobiotic chemical compounds. These cytosolic enzymes are different in their tissue distributions and substrate specificities. The gene structure (number and length of exons) is similar among family members. This gene sulfates dehydroepiandrosterone but not 4-nitrophenol, a typical substrate for the phenol and estrogen sulfotransferase subfamilies. Two alternatively spliced variants that encode different isoforms have been described.

== See also ==
- Steroid sulfotransferase
- Steroidogenic enzyme
