= SULT1E1 =

Protein-coding gene in the species Homo sapiens

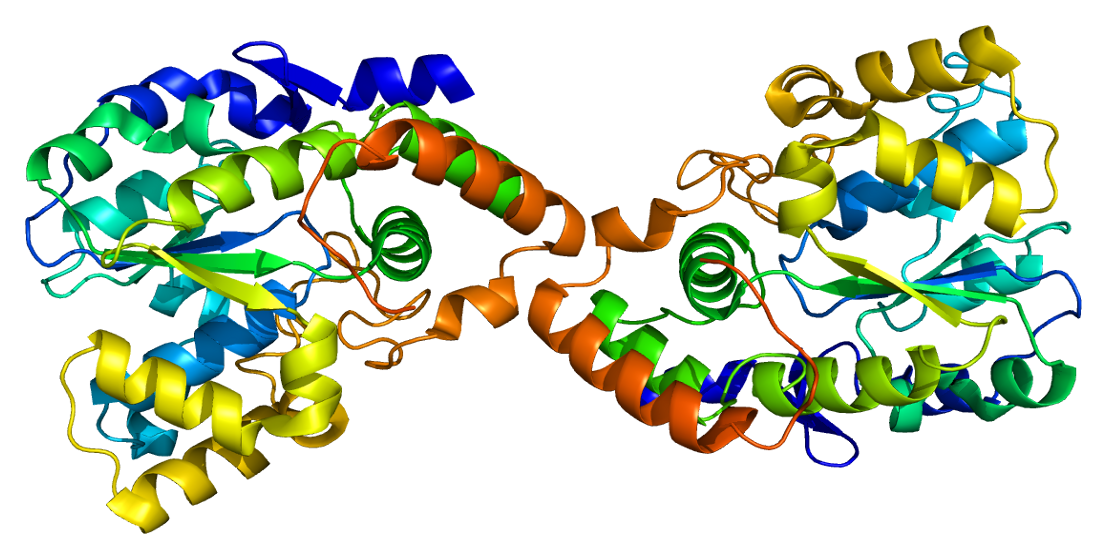

Identifiers
- Aliases: SULT1E1, EST, EST-1, ST1E1, STE, sulfotransferase family 1E member 1
- External IDs: OMIM: 600043; MGI: 98431; GeneCards: SULT1E1
Available structures
PDB	Ortholog search: PDBe RCSB
PDB	List of PDB id codes 1G3M, 1HY3, 4JVL, 4JVM, 4JVN
Enzyme activity
EC #	BRENDA	ExPASy	KEGG	MetaCyc
2.8.2.4	↗	↗	↗	↗

Gene location (Human)
Chr.	Chromosome 4 (human)
Band	4q13.3	Start	69,841,212 bp
Band	4q13.3	End	69,860,145 bp

Gene location (Mouse)
Chr.	Chromosome 5 (mouse)
Band	5 E1|5 43.56 cM	Start	87,723,828 bp
Band	5 E1|5 43.56 cM	End	87,739,453 bp
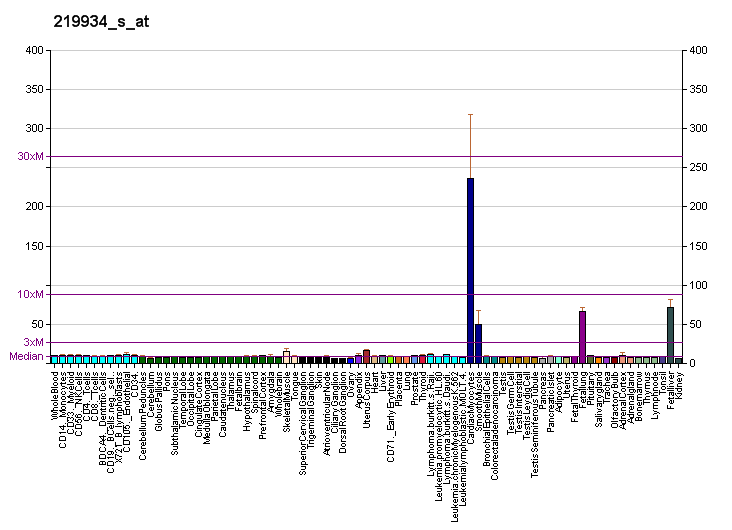
RNA expression pattern
Bgee	Human / Mouse (ortholog); Top expressed in: human penis; right adrenal gland; buccal mucosa cell; left adrenal cortex; right adrenal cortex; skin of leg; jejunal mucosa; skin of abdomen; duodenum; olfactory zone of nasal mucosa / Top expressed in: olfactory epithelium; efferent ductule; seminal vesicula; decidua; subcutaneous adipose tissue; spermatocyte; submandibular gland; white adipose tissue; parotid gland; tunica adventitia of aorta; More reference expression data
BioGPS	More reference expression data
Gene ontology
Molecular function	estrone sulfotransferase activity; transferase activity; sulfotransferase activity; steroid binding; steroid sulfotransferase activity; flavonol 3-sulfotransferase activity; protein binding; lipid binding; aryl sulfotransferase activity
Cellular component	cytoplasm; cytosol; nuclear membrane
Biological process	steroid metabolic process; positive regulation of fat cell differentiation; estrogen metabolic process; sulfation; ethanol catabolic process; estrogen catabolic process; 3'-phosphoadenosine 5'-phosphosulfate metabolic process
Sources:Amigo / QuickGO
Orthologs
Databases	NCBI: entry; OMA: entry
Species	Human	Mouse
Entrez	6783	20860
Ensembl	ENSG00000109193	ENSMUSG00000029272
UniProt	P49888	P49891; Q9D566
RefSeq (mRNA)	NM_005420	NM_023135
RefSeq (protein)	NP_005411	NP_075624
Location (UCSC)	Chr 4: 69.84 – 69.86 Mb	Chr 5: 87.72 – 87.74 Mb
PubMed search
- Wikidata
View/Edit Human	View/Edit Mouse

Estrogen sulfotransferase is an enzyme that in humans is encoded by the SULT1E1 gene.

Sulfotransferase enzymes catalyze the sulfate conjugation of many hormones, neurotransmitters, drugs, and xenobiotic compounds. These cytosolic enzymes are different in their tissue distributions and substrate specificities. The gene structure (number and length of exons) is similar among family members. This gene encodes a protein that transfers a sulfo moiety to and from estrone, which may control levels of estrogen receptors.

== See also ==
- Steroidogenic enzyme
- Steroid sulfotransferase
- Estrone sulfotransferase
- Steroid sulfatase
