= Bile salt sulfotransferase =

Protein-coding gene in the species Homo sapiens

SULT2A1
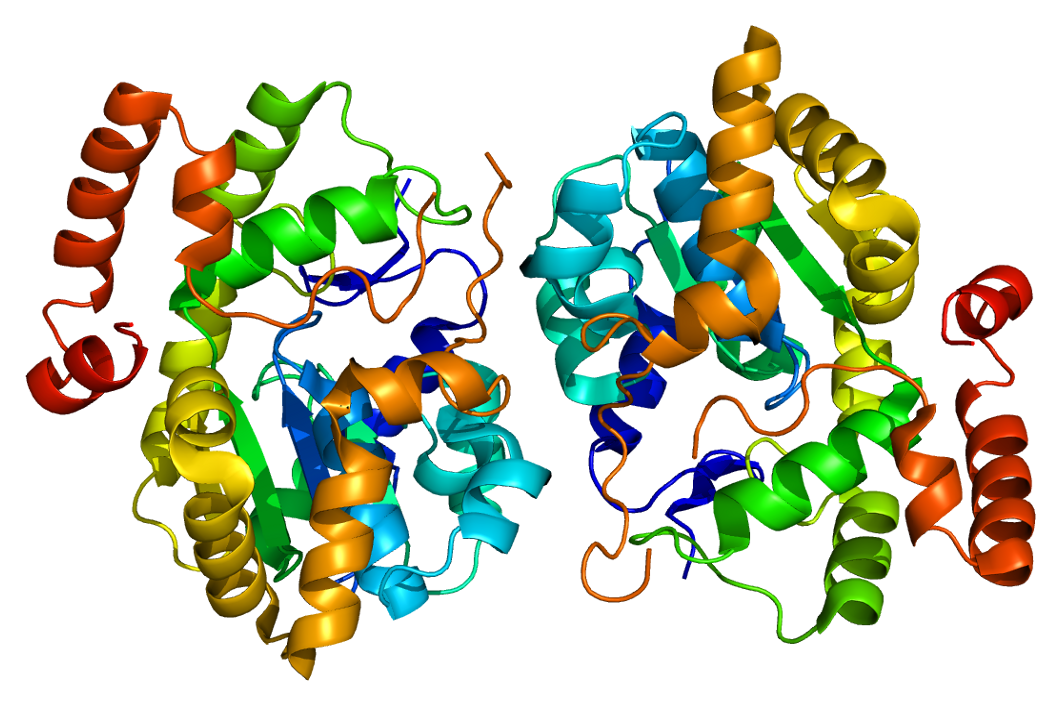

Identifiers
- Aliases: SULT2A1, DHEA-ST, DHEAS, HST, ST2, ST2A1, ST2A3, STD, hSTa, sulfotransferase family 2A member 1, DHEA-ST8, SULT2A3
- External IDs: OMIM: 125263; MGI: 3645854; GeneCards: SULT2A1
Available structures
PDB	Human UniProt search: PDBe RCSB
PDB	List of PDB id codes 1EFH, 1J99, 1OV4, 2QP3, 2QP4, 3F3Y, 4IFB
Enzyme activity
EC #	BRENDA	ExPASy	KEGG	MetaCyc
2.8.2.2	↗	↗	↗	↗
2.8.2.14	↗	↗	↗	↗

Gene location (Human)
Chr.	Chromosome 19 (human)
Band	19q13.33	Start	47,870,467 bp
Band	19q13.33	End	47,886,315 bp

Gene location (Mouse)
Chr.	Chromosome 7 (mouse)
Band	7|7 A1	Start	13,643,601 bp
Band	7|7 A1	End	13,723,532 bp
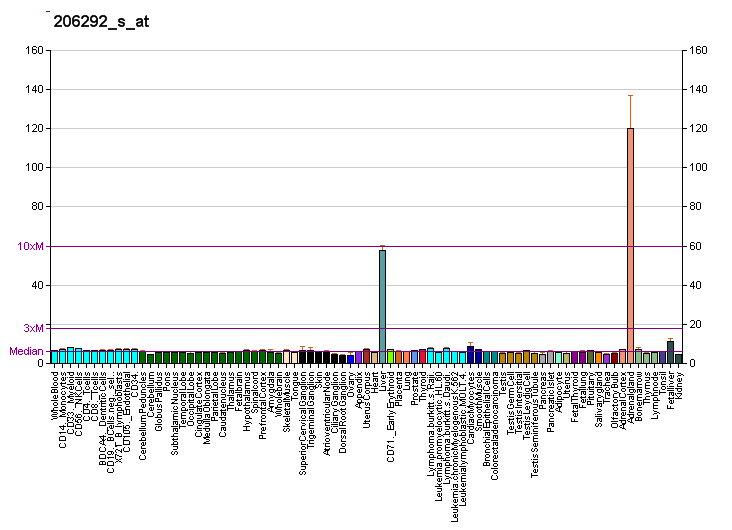

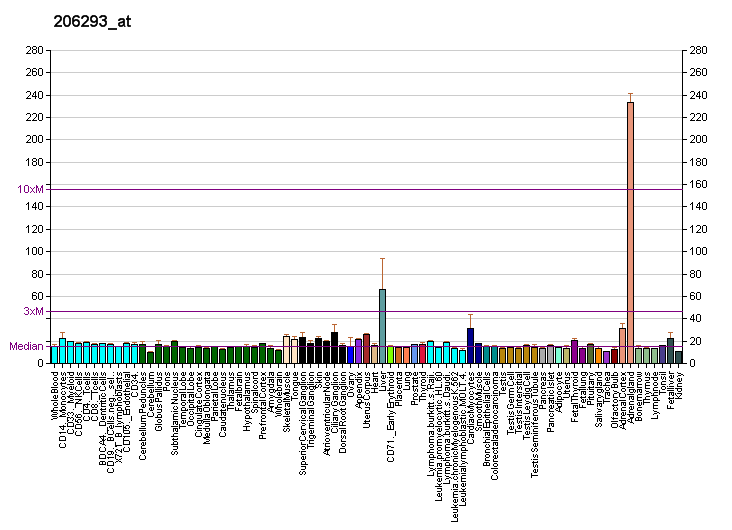
RNA expression pattern
Bgee	Human / Mouse (ortholog); Top expressed in: right adrenal cortex; jejunal mucosa; right lobe of liver; left adrenal cortex; duodenum; gonad; buccal mucosa cell; seminal vesicula; cardia; mucosa of ileum / Top expressed in: primary oocyte; zygote; secondary oocyte; spermatocyte; spermatid; gonad; testicle; liver; More reference expression data
BioGPS	More reference expression data
Gene ontology
Molecular function	transferase activity; sulfotransferase activity; protein binding; estrone sulfotransferase activity; aryl sulfotransferase activity; steroid sulfotransferase activity; bile-salt sulfotransferase activity
Cellular component	cytoplasm; cytosol
Biological process	lipid catabolic process; bile acid catabolic process; sulfation; lipid metabolism; ethanol catabolic process; regulation of lipid metabolic process; 3'-phosphoadenosine 5'-phosphosulfate metabolic process; steroid metabolic process
Sources:Amigo / QuickGO
Orthologs
Databases	NCBI: entry; OMA: entry
Species	Human	Mouse
Entrez	6822	434121
Ensembl	ENSG00000105398	ENSMUSG00000074377
UniProt	Q06520	n/a
RefSeq (mRNA)	NM_003167	NM_001101534
RefSeq (protein)	NP_003158	n/a
Location (UCSC)	Chr 19: 47.87 – 47.89 Mb	Chr 7: 13.64 – 13.72 Mb
PubMed search
- Wikidata
View/Edit Human	View/Edit Mouse

Bile salt sulfotransferase also known as hydroxysteroid sulfotransferase (HST) or sulfotransferase 2A1 (ST2A1) is an enzyme that in humans is encoded by the SULT2A1 gene.

== Function ==
Sulfotransferase enzymes catalyze the sulfate conjugation of many hormones, neurotransmitters, drugs, and xenobiotic compounds. These cytosolic enzymes are different in their tissue distributions and substrate specificities. The gene structure (number and length of exons) is similar among family members. This gene is primarily expressed in liver and adrenal tissues where the encoded protein sulfonates steroids and bile acids.

== See also ==
- Steroid sulfotransferase
- Steroidogenic enzyme
