= Estradiol valerate/prasterone enanthate =

Combination drug

Estradiol valerate / prasterone enanthate

- Estradiol valerate (top) and prasterone enanthate (bottom)

Combination of
- Estradiol valerate: Estrogen
- Prasterone enanthate: Androgen; Estrogen; Neurosteroid

Clinical data
- Trade names: Gynodian Depot, Binodian Depot, Cidodian Depot, Klimax, Supligol NF
- Other names: EV/DHEA-E; EV/PE; SH-70833-D
- Routes of administration: Intramuscular injection

Identifiers
- CAS Number: 979-32-8; 23983-43-9
- PubChem CID: 56841030
- UNII: OKG364O896; 2W8I1S6T5L

Estradiol valerate/prasterone enanthate (EV/DHEA-E), sold under the brand name Gynodian Depot among others, is an injectable combination medication of estradiol valerate (EV), an estrogen, and prasterone enanthate (DHEA-E), an androgen, estrogen, and neurosteroid, which is used in menopausal hormone therapy for women. It is provided in the form of 1 mL ampoules containing 4 mg estradiol valerate and 200 mg prasterone enanthate in an oil solution and is administered by intramuscular injection once every 4 to 6 weeks. EV/DHEA-E reportedly has a duration of about 21 days.

The medication is available in Europe, Latin America, and Egypt. EV/DHEA-E was developed and marketed by Schering, was first described in the literature in 1972, and was introduced for medical use in April 1975.

Androgen replacement therapy formulations and dosages used in women
Route	Medication	Major brand names	Form	Dosage
Oral	Testosterone undecanoate	Andriol, Jatenzo	Capsule	40–80 mg 1x/1–2 days
Oral	Methyltestosterone	Metandren, Estratest	Tablet	0.5–10 mg/day
Oral	Fluoxymesterone	Halotestin	Tablet	1–2.5 mg 1x/1–2 days
Oral	Normethandrone^{a}	Ginecoside	Tablet	5 mg/day
Oral	Tibolone	Livial	Tablet	1.25–2.5 mg/day
Oral	Prasterone (DHEA)^{b}	–	Tablet	10–100 mg/day
Sublingual	Methyltestosterone	Metandren	Tablet	0.25 mg/day
Transdermal	Testosterone	Intrinsa	Patch	150–300 μg/day
Transdermal	Testosterone	AndroGel	Gel, cream	1–10 mg/day
Vaginal	Prasterone (DHEA)	Intrarosa	Insert	6.5 mg/day
Injection	Testosterone propionate^{a}	Testoviron	Oil solution	25 mg 1x/1–2 weeks
Injection	Testosterone enanthate	Delatestryl, Primodian Depot	Oil solution	25–100 mg 1x/4–6 weeks
Injection	Testosterone cypionate	Depo-Testosterone, Depo-Testadiol	Oil solution	25–100 mg 1x/4–6 weeks
Injection	Testosterone isobutyrate^{a}	Femandren M, Folivirin	Aqueous suspension	25–50 mg 1x/4–6 weeks
Injection	Mixed testosterone esters	Climacteron^{a}	Oil solution	150 mg 1x/4–8 weeks
Injection	Mixed testosterone esters	Omnadren, Sustanon	Oil solution	50–100 mg 1x/4–6 weeks
Injection	Nandrolone decanoate	Deca-Durabolin	Oil solution	25–50 mg 1x/6–12 weeks
Injection	Prasterone enanthate^{a}	Gynodian Depot	Oil solution	200 mg 1x/4–6 weeks
Implant	Testosterone	Testopel	Pellet	50–100 mg 1x/3–6 months
Notes: Premenopausal women produce about 230 ± 70 μg testosterone per day (6.4 ± 2.0 mg testosterone per 4 weeks), with a range of 130 to 330 μg per day (3.6–9.2 mg per 4 weeks). Footnotes: ^{a} = Mostly discontinued or unavailable. ^{b} = Over-the-counter. Sources: See template.

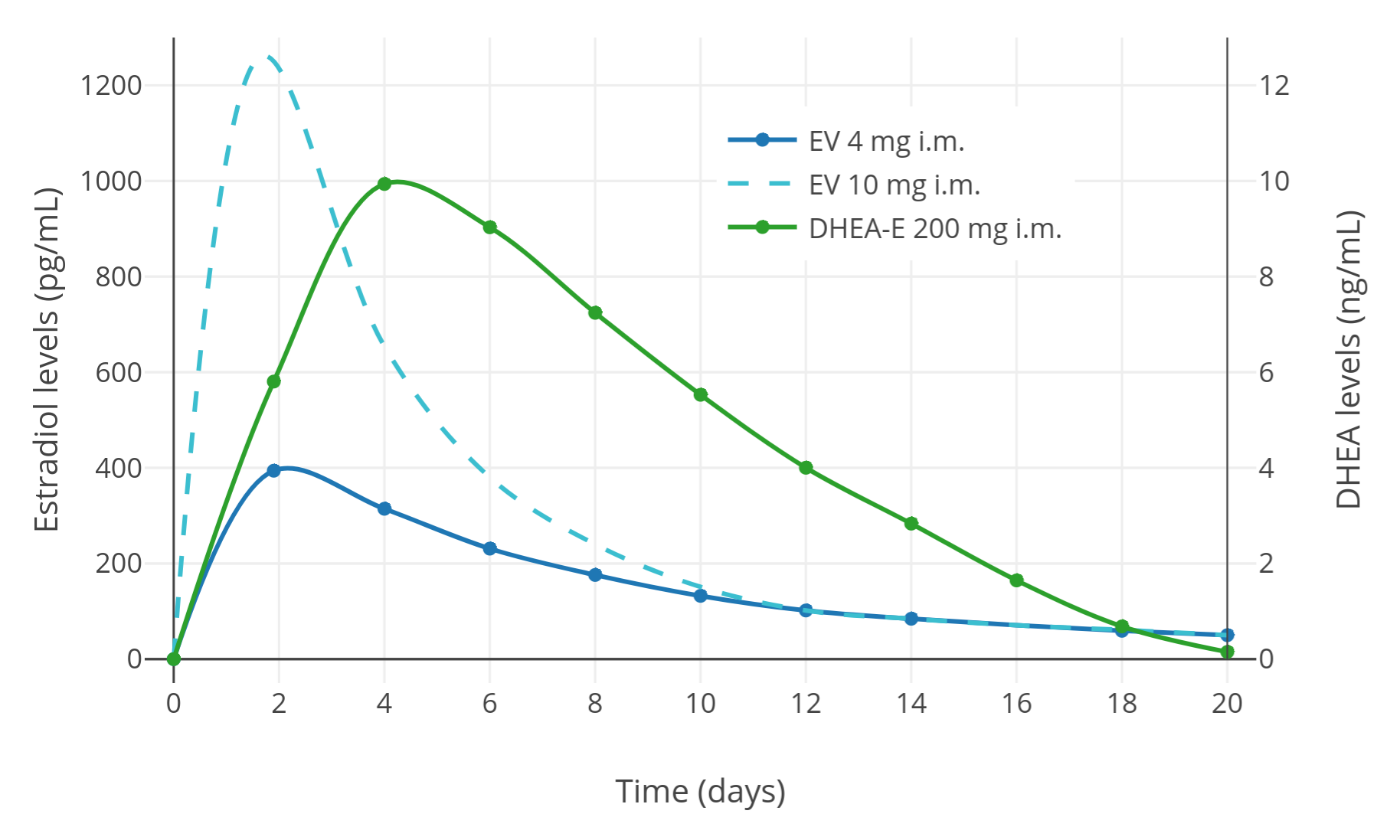
Estradiol and DHEA levels after a single intramuscular injection of Gynodian Depot (4 mg estradiol valerate, 200 mg prasterone enanthate in oil) in women.

== See also ==
- List of combined sex-hormonal preparations
