= Prasterone enanthate =

Chemical compound

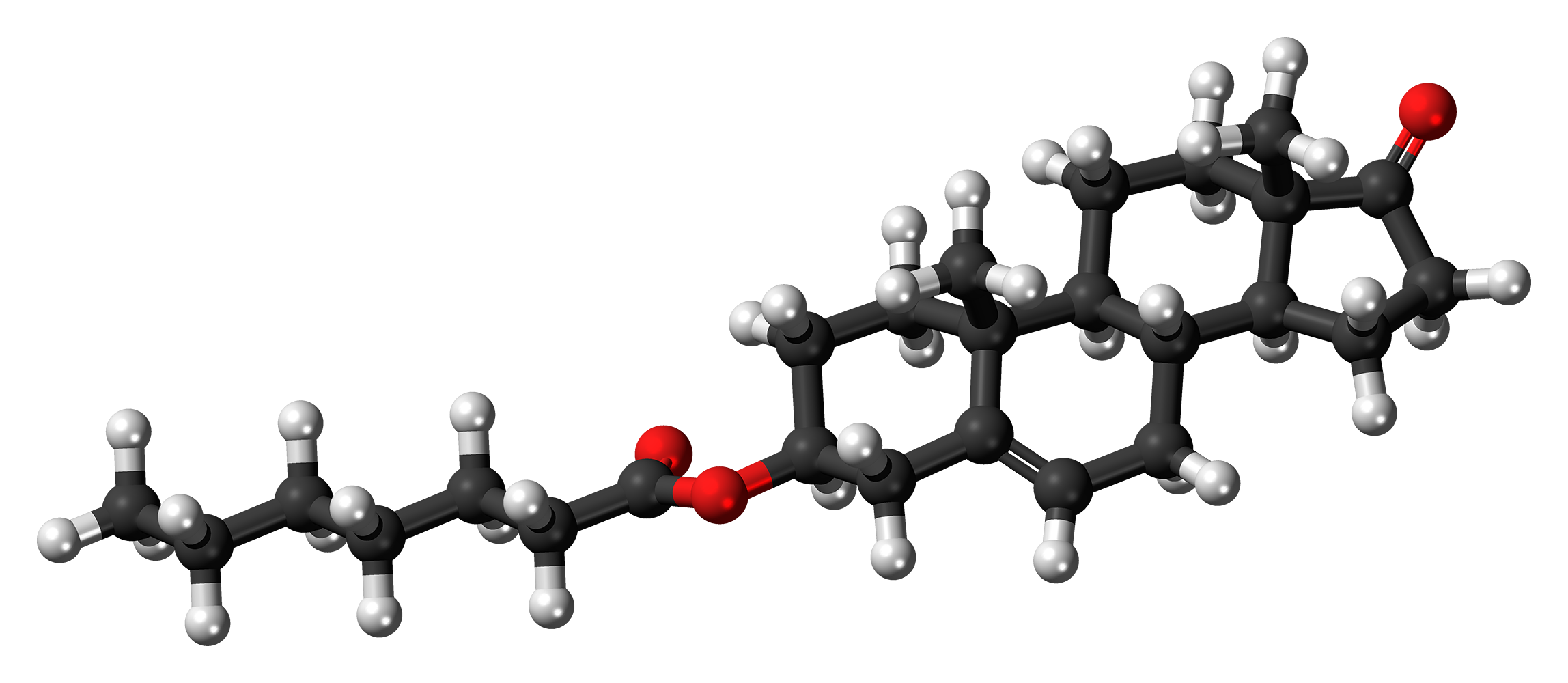

Clinical data
- Trade names: With estradiol valerate: Gynodian Depot, others
- Other names: DHEA enanthate; Prasterone heptanoate; DHEA heptanoate; DHEA-E; EDHEA; SH-90300-D; SH-70833-D (with EV); Androst-5-en-3β-ol-17-one 3β-heptanoate
- Routes of administration: Intramuscular injection
- Drug class: Androgen; Anabolic steroid; Androgen ester; Estrogen; Neurosteroid
- ATC code: G03EA03 (WHO) A14AA07 (WHO)

Legal status
- Legal status: In general: ℞ (Prescription only)

Pharmacokinetic data
- Bioavailability: IM: 100%
- Metabolites: • Prasterone (DHEA) • Others
- Elimination half-life: IM: 9 days IV: 44 minutes
- Duration of action: 18 days
- Excretion: Urine, feces

Identifiers
- IUPAC name: [(3S,8R,9S,10R,13S,14S)-10,13-Dimethyl-17-oxo-1,2,3,4,7,8,9,11,12,14,15,16-dodecahydrocyclopenta[a]phenanthren-3-yl] heptanoate
- CAS Number: 23983-43-9
- PubChem CID: 163331
- DrugBank: DB16625
- ChemSpider: 143333
- UNII: 2W8I1S6T5L
- CompTox Dashboard (EPA): DTXSID00946833
- ECHA InfoCard: 100.041.777

Chemical and physical data
- Formula: C_{26}H_{40}O_{3}
- Molar mass: 400.603 g·mol^{−1}
- 3D model (JSmol): Interactive image
- SMILES: CCCCCCC(=O)O[C@H]1CC[C@@]2([C@H]3CC[C@]4([C@H]([C@@H]3CC=C2C1)CCC4=O)C)C
- InChI: InChI=1S/C26H40O3/c1-4-5-6-7-8-24(28)29-19-13-15-25(2)18(17-19)9-10-20-21-11-12-23(27)26(21,3)16-14-22(20)25/h9,19-22H,4-8,10-17H2,1-3H3/t19-,20-,21-,22-,25-,26-/m0/s1; Key:HHENOUDBWKNPAB-BNCSLUSBSA-N

Prasterone enanthate, also known as dehydroepiandrosterone enanthate (DHEA-E) and sold in combination with estradiol valerate under the brand name Gynodian Depot among others, is a weak androgen, estrogen, and neurosteroid medication which is used as a component of menopausal hormone therapy to treat menopausal symptoms in women. It is available only as an injectable preparation in combination with estradiol valerate. The medication is given by injection into muscle typically once every 4 weeks.

Prasterone enanthate is a synthetic androgen, estrogen, and neurosteroid. It is a steroid ester and a long-lasting prodrug of prasterone (dehydroepiandrosterone; DHEA) in the body. Prasterone is a naturally occurring prohormone of androgens and estrogens and hence is an agonist of the androgen and estrogen receptors, the respective biological targets of androgens like testosterone and estrogens like estradiol. Prasterone also has a variety of activities of its own, including neurosteroid and other activities. An injection of prasterone enanthate has a duration of action in terms of elevated prasterone levels of about 18 days.

The combination of estradiol valerate and prasterone enanthate was developed as early as 1966 and was introduced for medical use in 1975. The formulation is marketed widely throughout Europe, and is also available in several Latin American countries and in Egypt. It is not available in any predominantly English-speaking countries.

== Medical uses ==
The combination of estradiol valerate and prasterone enanthate is used in menopausal hormone therapy to treat menopausal symptoms in peri- and postmenopausal women. Estradiol valerate serves as an estrogen in the preparation, while prasterone enanthate is intended to serve as a weak androgen. It is thought that the inclusion of prasterone enanthate in the formulation may provide additional psychotropic benefits.

Androgen replacement therapy formulations and dosages used in women
Route	Medication	Major brand names	Form	Dosage
Oral	Testosterone undecanoate	Andriol, Jatenzo	Capsule	40–80 mg 1x/1–2 days
Oral	Methyltestosterone	Metandren, Estratest	Tablet	0.5–10 mg/day
Oral	Fluoxymesterone	Halotestin	Tablet	1–2.5 mg 1x/1–2 days
Oral	Normethandrone^{a}	Ginecoside	Tablet	5 mg/day
Oral	Tibolone	Livial	Tablet	1.25–2.5 mg/day
Oral	Prasterone (DHEA)^{b}	–	Tablet	10–100 mg/day
Sublingual	Methyltestosterone	Metandren	Tablet	0.25 mg/day
Transdermal	Testosterone	Intrinsa	Patch	150–300 μg/day
Transdermal	Testosterone	AndroGel	Gel, cream	1–10 mg/day
Vaginal	Prasterone (DHEA)	Intrarosa	Insert	6.5 mg/day
Injection	Testosterone propionate^{a}	Testoviron	Oil solution	25 mg 1x/1–2 weeks
Injection	Testosterone enanthate	Delatestryl, Primodian Depot	Oil solution	25–100 mg 1x/4–6 weeks
Injection	Testosterone cypionate	Depo-Testosterone, Depo-Testadiol	Oil solution	25–100 mg 1x/4–6 weeks
Injection	Testosterone isobutyrate^{a}	Femandren M, Folivirin	Aqueous suspension	25–50 mg 1x/4–6 weeks
Injection	Mixed testosterone esters	Climacteron^{a}	Oil solution	150 mg 1x/4–8 weeks
Injection	Mixed testosterone esters	Omnadren, Sustanon	Oil solution	50–100 mg 1x/4–6 weeks
Injection	Nandrolone decanoate	Deca-Durabolin	Oil solution	25–50 mg 1x/6–12 weeks
Injection	Prasterone enanthate^{a}	Gynodian Depot	Oil solution	200 mg 1x/4–6 weeks
Implant	Testosterone	Testopel	Pellet	50–100 mg 1x/3–6 months
Notes: Premenopausal women produce about 230 ± 70 μg testosterone per day (6.4 ± 2.0 mg testosterone per 4 weeks), with a range of 130 to 330 μg per day (3.6–9.2 mg per 4 weeks). Footnotes: ^{a} = Mostly discontinued or unavailable. ^{b} = Over-the-counter. Sources: See template.

=== Available forms ===
Prasterone enanthate is available only as a combination formulation of 4 mg estradiol valerate and 200 mg prasterone enanthate in oil for depot intramuscular injection.

== Side effects ==
Prasterone enanthate, in combination with estradiol valerate at the dosages used clinically, has no masculinizing side effects. This is in contrast to combinations of estrogens with other androgens, such as testosterone esters.

The following is a list of possible side-effects that may occur in medicines that contain Estradiol Valerate / Prasterone Enanthate. This is not a comprehensive list. These side-effects are possible, but do not always occur. Some of the side-effects may be rare but serious. Consult your doctor if you observe any of the following side-effects, especially if they do not go away.

Dysmenorrhea Vaginitis Ovarian cancer Endometrial hyperplasia Endometrial cancer Breast cancer Stroke Increase in blood pressure Pulmonary embolism Nausea Vomiting Abdominal cramps Bloating Cholestatic jaundice Pruritus Rash Dizziness

Estradiol Valerate / Prasterone Enanthate may also cause side-effects not listed here.

== Pharmacology ==
=== Pharmacokinetics ===
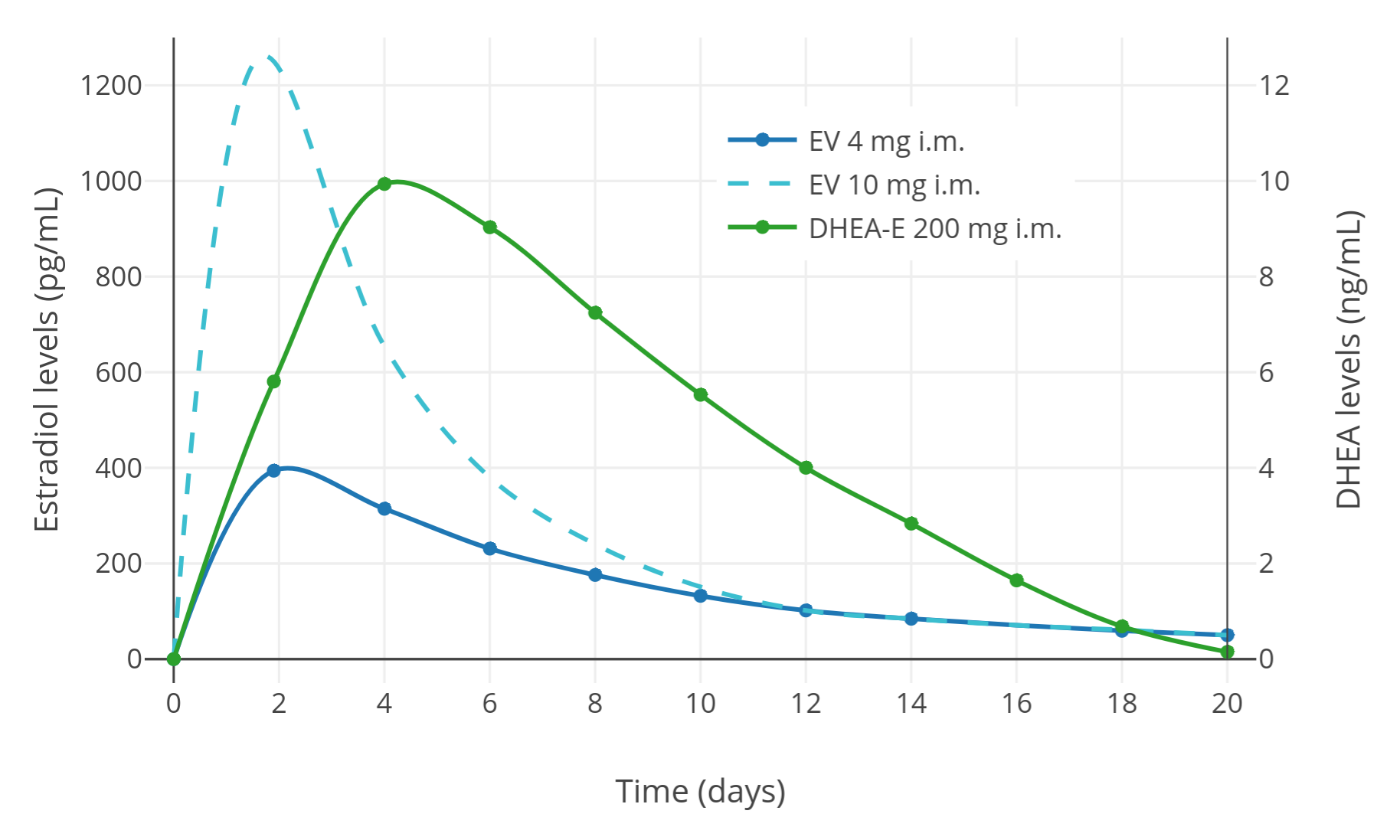
Estradiol and DHEA levels after a single intramuscular injection of Gynodian Depot (4 mg estradiol valerate, 200 mg prasterone enanthate in oil) in women.

The pharmacokinetics of prasterone enanthate have been assessed in a number of studies.

Prasterone enanthate is a prodrug of prasterone in the body. It is completely hydrolyzed into prasterone and heptanoic acid (enanthic acid) following absorption from the tissue depot after intramuscular injection.

Levels of DHEA peak at about 9 ng/mL within 1 to 4 days of an injection of prasterone enanthate. Subsequently, DHEA levels return to baseline by about 18 days following the injection. Prasterone enanthate has an elimination half-life of about 9 days. The plasma half-life of DHEA/prasterone enanthate following an intravenous injection is about 44 minutes. The half-lives of DHEA metabolites range up to 3.6 days.

Within 30 days, 91% of a dose of prasterone enanthate is eliminated. Approximately 94% is excreted in urine and 6% in feces. Prasterone enanthate is eliminated mainly in the form of metabolites and conjugates.

== Chemistry ==
Prasterone enanthate, also known as 5-dehydroepiandrosterone 3β-enanthate or as androst-5-en-3β-ol-17-one 3β-heptanoate, is a synthetic androstane steroid and the C3β heptanoate (enanthate) ester of prasterone (5-dehydroepiandrosterone).

== History ==
Prasterone enanthate was patented by Schering in 1968 and 1971. The combination of estradiol valerate and prasterone enanthate was developed and marketed by Schering, was first tested clinically as early as 1966, was first described in the scientific literature in 1972, and was first introduced for medical use in April 1975.

== Society and culture ==
=== Brand names ===
The major brand name of the combination of estradiol valerate and prasterone enanthate is Gynodian Depot. Other brand names of this formulation include Binodian Depot, Cidodian Depot, Klimax, and Supligol NF.

=== Availability ===
The combination of estradiol valerate and prasterone enanthate is marketed widely throughout Europe, and is also available in several Latin American countries and in Egypt. In Europe, it is available in Austria, the Czech Republic, Germany, Italy, Poland, Russia, Spain, and Switzerland. In Latin America, it is available in Argentina, Chile, Mexico, and Venezuela. The medication is not available in any predominantly English-speaking countries, including the United States, Canada, the United Kingdom, Ireland, Australia, New Zealand, or South Africa.

== See also ==
- Estradiol valerate/prasterone enanthate
